= List of acts of the Parliament of Australia =

This is an incomplete list of acts of the Parliament of Australia.

== By year ==
- List of acts of the Parliament of Australia from 1901
- List of acts of the Parliament of Australia from 1902
- List of acts of the Parliament of Australia from 1903
- List of acts of the Parliament of Australia from 1904
- List of acts of the Parliament of Australia from 1905
- List of acts of the Parliament of Australia from 1906
- List of acts of the Parliament of Australia from 1907
- List of acts of the Parliament of Australia from 1908
- List of acts of the Parliament of Australia from 1909
- List of acts of the Parliament of Australia from 1910

== Principal acts ==
Title of act	Year passed	Currently in force	Text of act
Abolition of Compulsory Age Retirement (Statutory Officeholders) Act 2001	2001 (No. 159)	Yes (as made)	
Aboriginal Affairs (Arrangements with the States) Act 1973	1973 (No. 115)	No	
Aboriginal and Torres Strait Islander Act 2005	1989 (No. 150)	Yes (as amended)	
Aboriginal and Torres Strait Islander Heritage Protection Act 1984	1984 (No. 79)	Yes (as amended)	
Aboriginal and Torres Strait Islander Land and Sea Future Fund Act 2018	2018 (No. 145)	Yes (as amended)	
Aboriginal and Torres Strait Islander Peoples Recognition Act 2013	2013 (No. 18)	No	
Aboriginal and Torres Strait Islanders (Queensland Discriminatory Laws) Act 1975	1975 (No. 75)	No	
Aboriginal and Torres Strait Islanders (Queensland Reserves and Communities Self-management) Act 1978	1978 (No. 11)	No	
Aboriginal Councils and Associations Act 1976	1976 (No. 186)	No	
Aboriginal Development Commission Act 1980	1980 (No. 34)	No	
Aboriginal Education (Supplementary Assistance) Act 1989	1990 (No. 1)	No	
Aboriginal Enterprises (Assistance) Act 1968	1968 (No. 154)	No	
Aboriginal Land Fund Act 1974	1974 (No. 159)	No	
Aboriginal Land Grant (Jervis Bay Territory) Act 1986	1986 (No. 164)	Yes (as amended)	
Aboriginal Land (Lake Condah and Framlingham Forest) Act 1987	1987 (No. 34)	Yes (as amended)	
Aboriginal Land Rights and Other Legislation Amendment Act 2013	2013 (No. 93)	Yes (as made)	
Aboriginal Land Rights (Northern Territory) Act 1976	1976 (No. 191)	Yes (as amended)	
Aboriginal Loans Commission Act 1974	1974 (No. 103)	No	
ACIS Administration Act 1999	1999 (No. 139)	No	
ACIS (Unearned Credit Liability) Act 1999	1999 (No. 140)	No	
Acoustic Laboratories Act 1948	1948 (No. 15)	No	
ACT Government Loan Act 2014	2014 (No. 132)	Yes (as made)	
Acts Interpretation Act 1901	1901 (No. 2)	Yes (as amended)	
Acts Interpretation Act 1904	1904 (No. 1)	No	
Acts Interpretation Amendment Act 1976	1976 (No. 144)	No	
Adelaide Airport Curfew Act 2000	2000 (No. 29)	Yes (as amended)	
Adelaide to Crystal Brook Railway Act 1974	1974 (No. 85)	No	
Administrative Appeals Tribunal Act 1975	1975 (No. 91)	Yes (as amended)	
Administrative Arrangements Act 1987	1987 (No. 92)	No	
Administrative Decisions (Judicial Review) Act 1977	1977 (No. 59)	Yes (as amended)	
Admiralty Act 1988	1988 (No. 34)	Yes (as amended)	
Advance Australia Logo Protection Act 1984	1984 (No. 20)	Yes (as amended)	
Advances to Settlers Act 1923	1923 (No. 19)	No	
Advisory Council for Inter-government Relations Act 1976	1976 (No. 106)	No	
AeroSpace Technologies of Australia Limited Sale Act 1994	1994 (No. 144)	Yes (as amended)	
Affirmative Action (Equal Employment Opportunity for Women) Act 1986	1986 (No. 91)	Yes (as amended)	
Age Discrimination Act 2004	2004 (No. 68)	Yes (as amended)	
Aged Care Act 1997	1997 (No. 112)	Yes (as amended	
Aged Care (Bond Security) Act 2006	2006 (No. 26)	Yes (as amended)	
Aged Care (Bond Security) Levy Act 2006	2006 (No. 27)	Yes (as amended)	
Aged Care (Consequential Provisions) Act 1997	1997 (No. 114)	No	
Aged Care Income Testing Act 1997	1997 (No. 103)	No	
Aged Care (Living Longer Living Better) Act 2013	2013 (No. 76)	Yes (as amended)	
Aged Care Quality and Safety Commission Act 2018	2018 (No. 149)	Yes (as amended)	
Aged Care Quality and Safety Commission (Consequential Amendments and Transitional Provisions) Act 2018	2018 (No. 150)	Yes (as made)	
Aged Care (Transitional Provisions) Act 1997	1997 (No. 223)	Yes (as amended)	
Aged Persons Homes Act 1954	1954 (No. 81)	No	
Aged Persons Hostels Act 1972	1972 (No. 76)	No	
Agreements Validation Act 1923	1923 (No. 31)	No	
Agricultural and Veterinary Chemical Products (Collection of Levy) Act 1994	1994 (No. 41)	Yes (as amended)	
Agricultural and Veterinary Chemical Products (Collection of Interim Levy) Act 1994	1994 (No. 71)	No	
Agricultural and Veterinary Chemical Products Interim Levy Imposition (Customs) Act 1994	1994 (No. 73)	No	
Agricultural and Veterinary Chemical Products Interim Levy Imposition (General) Act 1994	1994 (No. 74)	No	
Agricultural and Veterinary Chemical Products Interim Levy Imposition (Excise) Act 1994	1994 (No. 75)	No	
Agricultural and Veterinary Chemical Products Levy Imposition (Excise) Act 1994	1994 (No. 38)	Yes (as made)	
Agricultural and Veterinary Chemical Products Levy Imposition (Customs) Act 1994	1994 (No. 39)	Yes (as made)	
Agricultural and Veterinary Chemical Products Levy Imposition (General) Act 1994	1994 (No. 40)	Yes (as made)	
Agricultural and Veterinary Chemicals Act 1988	1988 (No. 91)	No	
Agricultural and Veterinary Chemicals Act 1994	1994 (No. 36)	Yes (as amended)	
Agricultural and Veterinary Chemicals (Administration) Act 1992	1992 (No. 262)	Yes (as amended)	
Agricultural and Veterinary Chemicals Code Act 1994	1994 (No. 47)	Yes (as amended)	
Agricultural and Veterinary Chemicals (Consequential Amendments) Act 1994	1994 (No. 37)	No	
Agricultural Tractors Bounty Act 1966	1966 (No. 82)	No	
AIDC Sale Act 1997	1997 (No. 67)	Yes (as made)	
Air Accidents (Commonwealth Government Liability) Act 1963	1963 (No. 74)	Yes (as amended)	
Air Force Act 1923	1923 (No. 33)	No	
Air Force (Canteens) Act 1957	1957 (No. 88)	No	
Air Navigation Act 1920	1920 (No. 50)	Yes (as amended)	
Air Navigation (Charges) Act 1952	1952 (No. 101)	No	
Air Navigation Legislation (Validation and Interpretation) Act 1982	1982 (No. 95)	Yes (as made)	
Air Passenger Ticket Levy (Collection) Act 2001	2001 (No. 132)	No	
Air Passenger Ticket Levy (Imposition) Act 2001	2001 (No. 133)	No	
Air Services Act 1995	1995 (No. 81)	Yes (as amended)	
Aircraft Noise Levy Act 1995	1995 (No. 97)	Yes (as amended)	
Aircraft Noise Levy Collection Act 1995	1995 (No. 98)	Yes (as amended)	
Airline Equipment (Loan Guarantee) Act 1968	1968 (No. 131)	No	
Airline Equipment (Loan Guarantee) Act 1969	1969 (No. 97)	No	
Airline Equipment (Loan Guarantee) Act 1972	1972 (No. 42)	No	
Airline Equipment (Loan Guarantee) Act 1974	1974 (No. 99)	No	
Airline Equipment (Loan Guarantee) Act 1976	1976 (No. 140)	No	
Airline Equipment (Loan Guarantee) Act 1977	1977 (No. 149)	No	
Airline Equipment (Loan Guarantee) Act 1978	1978 (No. 18)	No	
Airline Equipment (Loan Guarantee) Act (No. 2) 1978	1978 (No. 161)	No	
Airline Equipment (Loan Guarantee) Act 1980	1980 (No. 30)	No	
Airlines Equipment (Loan Guarantee) Act 1981	1981 (No. 38)	No	
Airlines Agreement Act 1981	1981 (No. 75)	No	
Airlines Equipment Act 1958	1958 (No. 70)	No	
Airports Act 1996	1996 (No. 42)	Yes (as amended)	
Airports (Business Concessions) Act 1959	1959 (No. 89)	No	
Airports (On-Airport Activities Administration) Validation Act 2010	2010 (No. 80)	Yes (as made)	
Airports (Surface Traffic) Act 1960	1960 (No. 40)	No	
Airports (Transitional) Act 1996	1996 (No. 36)	Yes (as amended)	
Airspace Act 2007	2007 (No. 38)	Yes (as amended)	
Airspace (Consequentials and Other Measures) Act 2007	2007 (No. 39)	Yes (as made)	
Albury-Wodonga Development Act 1973	1973 (No. 189)	No	
Albury-Wodonga Development (Financial Assistance) Act 1973	1973 (No. 190)	No	
Albury-Wodonga Development Corporation (Abolition) Act 2014	2014 (No. 117)	Yes (as amended)	
Alcohol Education and Rehabilitation Account Act 2001	2001 (No. 103)	No	
Aliens Act 1947	1947 (No. 22)	No	
Aliens Act Repeal Act 1984	1984 (No. 119)	No	
Aliens Deportation Act 1946	1946 (No. 29)	No	
Aliens Deportation Act 1948	1948 (No. 84)	No	
Aliens Registration Act 1920	1920 (No. 49)	No	
Aliens Registration Act 1939	1939 (No. 12)	No	
Aluminium Industry Act 1944	1944 (No. 44)	No	
Aluminium Industry Act 1960	1960 (No. 81)	No	
Amendments Incorporation Act 1905	1905 (No. 13)	No	
Anglo-Australian Telescope Agreement Act 1970	1970 (No. 57)	No	
ANL Guarantee Act 1994	1994 (No. 145)	No	
ANL Sale Act 1995	1995 (No. 136)	No	
Antarctic Marine Living Resources Conservation Act 1981	1981 (No. 30)	Yes (as amended)	
Antarctic Mining Prohibition Act 1991	1991 (No. 43)	No	
Antarctic Treaty Act 1960	1960 (No. 48)	Yes (as amended)	
Antarctic Treaty (Environment Protection) Act 1980	1980 (No. 103)	Yes (as amended)	
Anti-Dumping Authority Act 1988	1988 (No. 72)	No	
Anti-Money Laundering and Counter-Terrorism Financing Act 2006	2006 (No. 169)	Yes (as amended)	
Anti-Money Laundering and Counter-Terrorism Financing (Transitional Provisions and Consequential Amendments) Act 2006	2006 (No. 170)	Yes (as amended)	
Anti-Personnel Mines Convention Act 1998	1998 (No. 126)	Yes (as amended)	
Anzac Day Act 1995	1995 (No. 21)	Yes (as made)	
APEC Public Holiday Act 2007	2007 (No. 139)	No	
Apple and Pear Bounty Act 1936	1936 (No. 4)	No	
Apple and Pear Bounty Act 1937	1937 (No. 36)	No	
Apple and Pear Export Charge Act 1976	1976 (No. 197)	No	
Apple and Pear Export Charge Amendment Act 1981	1981 (No. 147)	No	
Apple and Pear Export Charge Collection Act 1976	1976 (No. 198)	No	
Apple and Pear Export Charges Act 1938	1938 (No. 59)	No	
Apple and Pear Export Underwriting Act 1981	1981 (No. 14)	No	
Apple and Pear Levy Act 1976	1976 (No. 195)	No	
Apple and Pear Levy Collection Act 1976	1976 (No. 196)	No	
Apple and Pear Organization Act 1938	1938 (No. 58)	No	
Apple and Pear Publicity and Research Act 1938	1938 (No. 61)	No	
Apple and Pear Stabilization Act 1971	1971 (No. 81)	No	
Apple and Pear Stabilization Export Duty Act 1971	1971 (No. 82)	No	
Apple and Pear Stabilization Export Duty Collection Act 1971	1971 (No. 83)	No	
Apple and Pear Tax Act 1938	1938 (No. 63)	No	
Apple and Pear Tax Assessment Act 1938	1938 (No. 62)	No	
Apple Bounty Act 1918	1918 (No. 21)	No	
Approved Defence Projects Protection Act 1947	1947 (No. 47)	No	
Arbitration (Foreign Awards and Agreements) Act 1974	1974 (No. 136)	Yes (as amended)	
Arbitration (Public Service) Act 1911	1911 (No. 11)	No	
Arbitration (Public Service) Act 1920	1920 (No. 28)	No	
Archives Act 1983	1983 (No. 79)	Yes (as amended)	
Asbestos Safety and Eradication Agency Act 2013	2013 (No. 58)	Yes (as amended)	
Asbestos-related Claims (Management of Commonwealth Liabilities) Act 2005	2005 (No. 122)	Yes (as amended)	
Ashmore and Cartier Islands Acceptance Act 1933	1933 (No. 60)	Yes (as amended)	
Asian Development Bank Act 1966	1966 (No. 25)	Yes (as made)	
Asian Development Bank (Additional Subscription) Act 1972	1972 (No. 60)	Yes (as made)	
Asian Development Bank (Additional Subscription) Act 1977	1977 (No. 21)	Yes (as made)	
Asian Development Bank (Additional Subscription) Act 1983	1983 (No. 90)	Yes (as made)	
Asian Development Bank (Additional Subscription) Act 1995	1995 (No. 6)	Yes (as made)	
Asian Development Bank (Additional Subscription) Act 2009	2009 (No. 109)	Yes (as made)	
Asian Development Bank (Special Funds Contributions) Act 1970	1970 (No. 113)	No	
Asian Development Fund Act 1974	1974 (No. 54)	No	
Asian Development Fund Act 1976	1976 (No. 146)	No	
Asian Development Fund Act 1978	1978 (No. 164)	No	
Asian Development Fund Act 1982	1982 (No. 151)	No	
Asian Development Fund Act 1987	1987 (No. 178)	No	
Asian Development Fund Act 1992	1992 (No. 36)	No	
Asian Infrastructure Investment Bank Act 2015	2015 (No. 134)	Yes (as made)	
ASIC Supervisory Cost Recovery Levy Act 2017	2017 (No. 43)	Yes (as amended)	
ASIC Supervisory Cost Recovery Levy (Collection) Act 2017	2017 (No. 44)	Yes (as made)	
Assistance for Severely Affected Regions (Special Appropriation) (Coronavirus Economic Response Package) Act 2020	2020 (No. 24)	Yes (as made)	
Atomic Energy Act 1953	1953 (No. 31)	Yes (as amended)	
Atomic Energy (Control of Materials) Act 1946	1946 (No. 34)	No	
Audit Act 1901	1901 (No. 4)	No	
Auditor-General Act 1997	1997 (No. 151)	Yes (as amended)	
AusCheck Act 2007	2007 (No. 53)	Yes (as amended)	
AusLink (National Land Transport) Act 2005	2005 (No. 93)	Yes (as amended)	
AUSSAT Repeal Act 1991	1991 (No. 145)	No	
Australia Act 1986	1985 (No. 142)	Yes (as made)	
Australia Council Act 1975	1975 (No. 11)	No	
Australia Council Act 2013	2013 (No. 71)	Yes (as amended)	
Australia Council (Consequential and Transitional Provisions) Act 2013	2013 (No. 72)	Yes (as made)	
Australia (Request and Consent) Act 1985	1985 (No. 43)	Yes (as made)	
Australia-Japan Foundation Act 1976	1976 (No. 18)	No	
Australian Aged Care Quality Agency Act 2013	2013 (No. 79)	No	
Australian Aged Care Quality Agency (Transitional Provisions) Act 2013	2013 (No. 78)	No	
Australian Airlines (Conversion to Public Company) Act 1988	1988 (No. 6)	Yes (as amended)	
Australian and Overseas Telecommunications Corporation Act 1991	1991 (No. 79)	Yes (as amended)	
Australian Animal Health Council (Live-stock Industries) Funding Act 1996	1996 (No. 45)	Yes (as amended)	
Australian Antarctic Territory Acceptance Act 1933	1933 (No. 8)	Yes (as amended)	
Australian Antarctic Territory Act 1954	1954 (No. 42)	Yes (as amended)	
Australian Apple and Pear Corporation Act 1973	1973 (No. 194)	No	
Australian Astronomical Observatory Act 2010	2010 (No. 11)	Yes (as amended)	
Australian Astronomical Observatory (Transitional Provisions) Act 2010	2010 (No. 12)	No	
Australian Bicentennial Authority Act 1980	1980 (No. 49)	No	
Australian Bicentennial Road Development Trust Fund Act 1982	1982 (No. 133)	No	
Australian Border Force Act 2015	2015 (No. 40)	Yes (as amended)	
Australian Broadcasting Act 1942	1942 (No. 33)	No	
Australian Broadcasting Commission Act 1932	1932 (No. 14)	No	
Australian Broadcasting Corporation Act 1983	1983 (No. 6)	Yes (as amended)	
Australian Broadcasting Corporation (Transitional Provisions and Consequential Amendments) Act 1983	1983 (No. 7)	Yes (as amended)	
Australian Bureau of Statistics Act 1975	1975 (No. 60)	Yes (as amended)	
Australian Business Growth Fund (Coronavirus Economic Response Package) Act 2020	2020 (No. 28)	Yes (as made)	
Australian Business Securitisation Fund Act 2019	2019 (No. 46)	Yes (as made)	
Australian Capital Territory (Electoral) Act 1988	1988 (No. 107)	No	
Australian Capital Territory Electricity Supply Act 1962	1962 (No. 76)	No	
Australian Capital Territory Evidence (Temporary Provisions) Act 1971	1971 (No. 66)	Yes (as amended)	
Australian Capital Territory Gaming and Liquor Authority Act 1981	1981 (No. 116)	No	
Australian Capital Territory Government Service (Consequential Provisions) Act 1994	1994 (No. 92)	Yes (as amended)	
Australian Capital Territory (Planning and Land Management) Act 1988	1988 (No. 108)	Yes (as amended)	
Australian Capital Territory Representation Act 1948	1948 (No. 57)	No	
Australian Capital Territory Representation (House of Representatives) Act 1973	1973 (No. 111)	No	
Australian Capital Territory Representation (House of Representatives) Act 1974	1974 (No. 8)	No	
Australian Capital Territory (Self-Government) Act 1988	1988 (No. 106)	Yes (as amended)	
Australian Capital Territory Stamp Duty Act 1969	1969 (No. 48)	No	
Australian Capital Territory Tax (Cheques) Act 1969	1969 (No. 43)	No	
Australian Capital Territory Tax (Hire-purchase Business) Act 1969	1969 (No. 44)	No	
Australian Capital Territory Tax (Insurance Business) Act 1969	1969 (No. 45)	No	
Australian Capital Territory Tax (Sales of Marketable Securities) Act 1969	1969 (No. 46)	No	
Australian Capital Territory Tax (Purchases of Marketable Securities) Act 1969	1969 (No. 47)	No	
Australian Capital Territory Tax (Transfers of Marketable Securities) Act 1986	1986 (No. 148)	No	
Australian Capital Territory Tax (Vehicle Registration) Act 1981	2004 (No. 129)	No	
Australian Capital Territory Taxation (Administration) Act 1969	1969 (No. 42)	No	
Australian Centennial Roads Development Act 1988	1988 (No. 154)	No	
Australian Centre for International Agricultural Research Act 1982	1982 (No. 9)	Yes (as amended)	
Australian Centre for Renewable Energy Act 2010	2010 (No. 18)	No	
Australian Charities and Not-for-profits Commission Act 2012	2012 (No. 168)	Yes (as amended)	
Australian Charities and Not-for-profits Commission (Consequential and Transitional) Act 2012	2012 (No. 169)	Yes (as made)	
Australian Citizenship Act 2007	2007 (No. 20)	Yes (as amended)	
Australian Citizenship (Transitionals and Consequentials) Act 2007	2007 (No. 21)	Yes (as amended)	
Australian Civilian Corps Act 2011	2011 (No. 18)	Yes (as amended)	
Australian Civilian Corps Amendment Act 2013	2013 (No. 140)	Yes (as made)	
Australian Coastal Shipping Commission Act 1956	1956 (No 41)	No	
Australian Coastal Shipping Agreement Act 1956	1956 (No. 42)	No	
Australian Commission on Advanced Education Act 1971	1971 (No. 116)	No	
Australian Communications and Media Authority Act 2005	2005 (No. 44)	Yes (as amended)	
Australian Communications and Media Authority (Consequential and Transitional Provisions) Act 2005	2005 (No. 45)	Yes (as amended)	
Australian Communications Authority Act 1997	1997 (No. 52)	No	
Australian Crime Commission Establishment Act 2002	2002 (No. 125)	Yes (as amended)	
Australian Crime Commission (National Policing Information Charges) Act 2016	2016 (No. 44)	Yes (as made)	
Australian Curriculum, Assessment and Reporting Authority Act 2008	2008 (No. 136)	Yes (as amended)	
Australian Defence Force Cover Act 2015	2015 (No. 118)	Yes (as amended)	
Australian Defence Force Superannuation Act 2015	2015 (No. 119)	Yes (as amended)	
Australian Development Assistance Agency Act 1974	1974 (No. 137)	No	
Australian Development Assistance Agency (Repeal) Act 1977	1977 (No. 24)	No	
Australian Dried Fruits Corporation Act 1978	1978 (No. 193)	No	
Australian Education Act 2013	2013 (No. 67)	Yes (as amended)	
Australian Education (Consequential and Transitional Provisions) Act 2013	2013 (No. 68)	Yes (as amended)	
Australian Electoral Office Act 1973	1973 (No. 83)	No	
Australian Energy Market Act 2004	2004 (No. 99)	Yes (as amended)	
Australian Federal Police Act 1979	1979 (No. 58)	Yes (as amended)	
Australian Film Commission Act 1975	1975 (No. 6)	No	
Australian Film Development Corporation Act 1970	1970 (No. 21)	No	
Australian Heritage Commission Act 1975	1975 (No. 57)	No	
Australian Heritage Council Act 2003	2003 (No. 85)	Yes (as amended)	
Australian Heritage Council (Consequential and Transitional Provisions) Act 2003	2003 (No. 86)	Yes (as amended)	
Australian Horticultural Corporation Act 1987	1987 (No. 164)	No	
Australian Horticultural Corporation (Transitional Provisions and Consequential Amendments) Act 1987	1987 (No. 165)	No	
Australian Housing Corporation Act 1975	1975 (No. 25)	No	
Australian Immunisation Register Act 2015	2015 (No. 138)	Yes (as amended)	
Australian Immunisation Register (Consequential and Transitional Provisions) Act 2015	2015 (No. 139)	Yes (as made)	
Australian Imperial Force Canteens Funds Act 1920	1920 (No. 3)	No	
Australian Industries Preservation Act 1906	1906 (No. 9)	No	
Australian Industry Development Corporation Act 1970	1970 (No. 15)	No	
Australian Information Commissioner Act 2010	2010 (No. 52)	Yes (as amended)	
Australian Institute of Aboriginal and Torres Strait Islander Studies Act 1989	1989 (No. 149)	Yes (as amended)	
Australian Institute of Aboriginal Studies Act 1964	1964 (No. 56)	No	
Australian Institute of Anatomy Agreement Act 1931	1931 (No. 44)	No	
Australian Institute of Health Act 1987	1987 (No. 41)	Yes (as amended)	
Australian Institute of Marine Science Act 1970	1970 (No. 19)	No	
Australian Institute of Marine Science Act 1972	1972 (No. 55)	Yes (as amended)	
Australian Institute of Multicultural Affairs Act 1979	1979 (No. 154)	No	
Australian Institute of Multicultural Affairs Repeal Act 1986	1986 (No. 161)	No	
Australian Institute of Sport Act 1986	1986 (No. 103)	No	
Australian Institute of Sport (Consequential Provisions) Act 1986	1986 (No. 104)	No	
Australian Jobs Act 2013	2013 (No. 69)	Yes (as amended)	
Australian Land Transport (Financial Assistance) Act 1985	1985 (No. 59)	No	
Australian Law Reform Commission Act 1996	1996 (No. 37)	Yes (as amended)	
Australian Law Reform Commission (Repeal, Transitional and Miscellaneous) Act 1996	1996 (No. 38)	No	
Australian Maritime Safety Authority Act 1990	1990 (No. 78)	Yes (as amended)	
Australian Meat and Live-stock Corporation Act 1977	1977 (No. 67)	No	
Australian Meat and Live-stock Industry Act 1997	1997 (No. 206)	Yes (as amended)	
Australian Meat and Live-stock Industry Policy Council Act 1984	1984 (No. 58)	No	
Australian Meat and Live-stock Industry (Repeals and Consequential Provisions) Act 1997	1997 (No. 207)	Yes (as amended)	
Australian Meat and Live-stock Industry Selection Committee Act 1984	1984 (No. 59)	No	
Australian Meat and Live-stock Legislation (Consequential Amendments and Transitional Provisions) Act 1985	1985 (No. 13)	Yes (as amended)	
Australian Meat and Live-stock (Quotas) Act 1990	1990 (No. 117)	No	
Australian Meat and Live-stock Research and Development Corporation Act 1985	1985 (No. 12)	No	
Australian National Airlines Act 1945	1945 (No. 31)	Yes (as amended)	
Australian National Airlines Commission Equipment Act 1967	1967 (No. 49)	No	
Australian National Airlines Repeal Act 1981	1981 (No. 78)	No	
Australian National Maritime Museum Act 1990	1990 (No. 90)	Yes (as amended)	
Australian National Preventive Health Agency Act 2010	2010 (No. 134)	Yes (as amended)	
Australian National Railways Commission Act 1983	1983 (No. 140)	No	
Australian National Railways Commission Sale Act 1997	1997 (No. 96)	Yes (as amended)	
Australian National Registry of Emissions Units Act 2011	2011 (No. 99)	Yes (as amended)	
Australian National Training Authority Act 1992	1992 (No. 203)	No	
Australian National University Act 1946	1946 (No. 22)	No	
Australian National University Act 1960	1960 (No. 3)	No	
Australian National University Act 1973	1973 (No. 96)	No	
Australian National University Act 1991	1991 (No. 131)	Yes (as amended)	
Australian Notes Act 1910	1910 (No. 11)	No	
Australian Nuclear Science and Technology Organisation Act 1987	1987 (No. 3)	Yes (as amended)	
Australian Nuclear Science and Technology Organisation (Transitional Provisions) Act 1987	1987 (No. 4)	No	
Australian Organ and Tissue Donation and Transplantation Authority Act 2008	2008 (No. 122)	Yes (as amended)	
Australian Overseas Projects Corporation Act 1978	1978 (No. 105)	No	
Australian Participants in British Nuclear Tests (Treatment) Act 2006	2006 (No. 135)	Yes (as amended)	
Australian Passports Act 2005	2005 (No. 5)	Yes (as amended)	
Australian Passports (Application Fees) Act 2005	2005 (No. 6)	Yes (as made)	
Australian Passports (Transitionals and Consequentials) Act 2005	2005 (No. 7)	No	
Australian Postal Corporation Act 1989	1989 (No. 64)	Yes (as amended)	
Australian Protective Service Act 1987	1987 (No. 7)	No	
Australian Prudential Regulation Authority Act 1998	1998 (No. 50)	Yes (as amended)	
Australian Radiation Protection and Nuclear Safety Act 1998	1998 (No. 133)	Yes (as amended)	
Australian Radiation Protection and Nuclear Safety (Licence Charges) Act 1998	1998 (No, 134)	Yes (as amended)	
Australian Renewable Energy Agency Act 2011	2011 (No. 151)	Yes (as amended)	
Australian Renewable Energy Agency (Consequential Amendments and Transitional Provisions) Act 2011	2011 (No. 152)	Yes (as made)	
Australian Research Council Act 2001	2001 (No. 8)	Yes (as amended)	
Australian Research Council (Consequential and Transitional Provisions) Act 2001	2001 (No. 9)	No	
Australian River Co. Limited Act 2015	2015 (No. 27)	Yes (as amended)	
Australian Rural Bank Act 1977	1977 (No. 156)	No	
Australian Science and Technology Council Act 1978	1978 (No. 81)	No	
Australian Securities and Investments Commission Act 2001	2001 (No. 51)	Yes (as amended)	
Australian Securities Commission Act 1989	1989 (No. 90)	No	
Australian Security Intelligence Organization Act 1956	1956 (No. 113)	No	
Australian Security Intelligence Organization Act 1976	1976 (No. 2)	No	
Australian Security Intelligence Organisation Act 1979	1979 (No. 113)	Yes (as amended)	
Australian Shipping Commission (Additional Capital) Act 1985	1985 (No. 57)	No	
Australian Small Business and Family Enterprise Ombudsman Act 2015	2015 (No. 123)	Yes (as amended)	
Australian Small Business and Family Enterprise Ombudsman (Consequential and Transitional Provisions) Act 2015	2015 (No. 124)	Yes (as made)	
Australian Soldiers’ Repatriation Act 1917	1917 (No. 37)	No	
Australian Soldiers’ Repatriation Act 1920	1920 (No. 6)	No	
Australian Soldiers’ Repatriation Act 1929	1929 (No. 14)	No	
Australian Soldiers' Repatriation Fund Act 1916	1916 (No. 7)	No	
Australian Space Council Act 1994	1994 (No. 27)	No	
Australian Sports Anti-Doping Authority Act 2006	2006 (No. 6)	Yes (as amended)	
Australian Sports Anti-Doping Authority (Consequential and Transitional Provisions) Act 2006	2006 (No. 7)	Yes (as made)	
Australian Sports Commission Act 1985	1985 (No. 77)	No	
Australian Sports Commission Act 1989	1989 (No. 12)	Yes (as amended)	
Australian Sports Drug Agency Act 1990	1991 (No. 18)	No	
Australian Technical Colleges (Flexibility in Achieving Australia's Skills Needs) Act 2005	2005 (No. 124)	No	
Australian Telecommunications Corporation Act 1989	1989 (No. 54)	No	
Australian Tourist Commission Act 1967	1967 (No. 27)	No	
Australian Tourist Commission Act 1987	1987 (No. 136)	No	
Australian Trade Commission Act 1985	1985 (No. 186)	Yes (as amended)	
Australian Trade Commission Legislation Amendment Act 2006	2006 (No. 56)	Yes (as amended)	
Australian Trade Commission (Transitional Provisions and Consequential Amendments) Act 1985	1985 (No. 187)	Yes (as made)	
Australian Transaction Reports and Analysis Centre Supervisory Cost Recovery Levy Act 2011	2011 (No. 54)	Yes (as amended)	
Australian Transaction Reports and Analysis Centre Supervisory Cost Recovery Levy (Collection) Act 2011	2011 (No. 55)	Yes (as amended)	
Australian Transaction Reports and Analysis Centre Supervisory Cost Recovery Levy (Consequential Amendments) Act 2011	2011 (No. 56)	Yes (as amended)	
Australian Universities Commission Act 1959	1959 (No. 30)	No	
Australian Veterans’ Recognition (Putting Veterans and Their Families First) Act 2019	2019 (No. 96)	Yes (as made)	
Australian War Memorial Act 1925	1925 (No. 18)	No	
Australian War Memorial Act 1962	1962 (No. 85)	No	
Australian War Memorial Act 1980	1980 (No. 104)	Yes (as amended)	
Australian Wine and Brandy Corporation Act 1980	1980 (No. 161)	Yes (as amended)	
Australian Wool Commission Act 1970	1970 (No. 103)	No	
Australian Wool Corporation Act 1991	1991 (No. 108)	No	
Australian Wool Industry Council Act 1991	1991 (No. 97)	No	
Australian Wool Realisation Commission Act 1991	1991 (No. 107)	No	
Australian Wool Research and Promotion Organisation Act 1993	1993 (No. 63)	No	
Australian Wool Testing Authority Act 1957	1957 (No. 38)	No	
Australian Workplace Safety Standards Act 2005	2005 (No. 134)	No	
Authorised Deposit-taking Institutions Supervisory Levy Imposition Act 1998	1998 (No. 51)	Yes (as amended)	
Authorised Non-operating Holding Companies Supervisory Levy Determination Validation Act 2000	2000 (No. 14)	No	
Automatic Data Processing Equipment Bounty Act 1977	1977 (No. 28)	No	
Automotive Industry Authority Act 1984	1984 (No. 106)	No	
Automotive Transformation Scheme Act 2009	2009 (No. 93)	Yes (as amended)	
Autonomous Sanctions Act 2011	2011 (No. 38)	Yes (as amended)	
Aviation Fuel Revenues (Special Appropriation) Act 1988	1988 (No. 54)	Yes (as amended)	
Aviation Transport Security Act 2004	2004 (No. 8)	Yes (as amended)	
Aviation Transport Security (Consequential Amendments and Transitional Provisions) Act 2004	2004 (No. 9)	Yes (as amended)	
Ballast Water Research and Development Funding Levy Act 1998	1998 (No. 21)	No	
Ballast Water Research and Development Funding Levy Collection Act 1998	1998 (No. 38)	No	
Bank Account Debits Tax Act 1982	1982 (No. 141)	No	
Bank Account Debits Tax Administration Act 1982	1981 (No. 142)	No	
Bank Integration Act 1991	1991 (No. 210)	Yes (as amended)	
Bank Notes Tax Act 1910	1910 (No. 14)	No	
Banking Act 1945	1945 (No. 14)	No	
Banking Act 1947	1947 (No. 57)	No	
Banking Act 1959	1959 (No. 6)	Yes (as amended)	
Banking (State Bank of South Australia and Other Matters) Act 1994	1994 (No. 69)	Yes (as made)	
Banking (Transitional Provisions) Act 1959	1959 (No. 7)	No	
Bankruptcy Act 1924	1924 (No. 37)	No	
Bankruptcy Act 1966	1966 (No. 33)	Yes (as amended)	
Bankruptcy (Estate Charges) Act 1997	1997 (No. 12)	Yes (as amended)	
Bankruptcy (Registration Charges) Act 1997	1997 (No. 13)	No	
Bankruptcy (Validation) Act 1967	1967 (No. 75)	No	
Banks (Housing Loans) Act 1974	1974 (No. 143)	No	
Banks (Shareholdings) Act 1972	1972 (No. 2)	No	
Barley Research Act 1980	1980 (No. 168)	No	
Barley Research Levy Act 1980	1980 (No. 169)	No	
Bass Strait Freight Adjustment Levy Act 1984	1984 (No. 25)	No	
Bass Strait Freight Adjustment Levy Collection Act 1984	1984 (No. 26)	No	
Bass Strait Freight Adjustment Trust Fund Act 1984	1984 (No. 24)	No	
Bass Strait Sea Passenger Service Agreement Act 1984	1984 (No. 167)	No	
Beaches, Fishing Grounds and Sea Routes Protection Act 1932	1932 (No. 73)	No	
Bed Sheeting Bounty Act 1977	1977 (No. 29)	No	
Beef Industry (Incentive Payments) Act 1977	1977 (No. 105)	No	
Beef Production Levy Act 1990	1990 (No. 140)	No	
Beer Excise Act 1901	1901 (No. 7)	No	
Belgian Grant Act 1914	1914 (No. 8)	No	
Berry Fruit-growers' Relief Act 1941	1941 (No. 32)	No	
Bills of Exchange Act 1909	1909 (No. 27)	Yes (as amended)	
Biological Control Act 1984	1984 (No. 139)	Yes (as amended)	
Biosecurity Act 2015	2015 (No. 61)	Yes (as amended)	
Biosecurity (Consequential Amendments and Transitional Provisions) Act 2015	2015 (No. 62)	Yes (as amended)	
Black Marketing Act 1942	1942 (No. 49)	No	
Blowering Water Storage Works Agreement Act 1963	1963 (No. 95)	No	
Book Bounty Act 1969	1969 (No. 83)	No	
Boosting Cash Flow for Employers (Coronavirus Economic Response Package) Act 2020	2020 (No. 23)	Yes (as made)	
Bounties Act 1907	1907 (No. 12)	No	
Bounty (Agricultural Tractors and Equipment) Act 1985	1985 (No. 134)	No	
Bounty (Berry Fruits) Act 1982	1982 (No. 132)	No	
Bounty (Books) Act 1986	1986 (No. 127)	No	
Bounty (Citric Acid) Act 1991	1991 (No. 56)	No	
Bounty (Commercial Motor Vehicles) Act 1978	1978 (No. 208)	No	
Bounty (Computers) Act 1984	1984 (No. 113)	No	
Bounty (Dental Alloys) Act 1979	1979 (No. 71)	No	
Bounty (Drilling Bits) Act 1980	1980 (No. 33)	No	
Bounty (Drilling Machines) Act 1978	1978 (No. 10)	No	
Bounty (Electric Motors) Act 1984	1984 (No. 112)	No	
Bounty (Fuel Ethanol) Act 1994	1994 (No. 83)	No	
Bounty (High Alloy Steel Products) Act 1983	1983 (No. 126)	No	
Bounty (Injection-moulding Equipment) Act 1979	1979 (No. 78)	No	
Bounty (Metal-working Machine Tools) Act 1978	1978 (No. 154)	No	
Bounty (Metal Working Machines and Robots) Act 1985	1985 (No. 133)	No	
Bounty (Non-Adjustable Wrenches) Act 1981	1981 (No. 18)	No	
Bounty (Paper) Act 1979	1979 (No. 72)	No	
Bounty (Penicillin) Act 1980	1980 (No. 47)	No	
Bounty (Photographic Film) Act 1989	1989 (No. 172)	No	
Bounty (Polyester-Cotton Yarn) Act 1978	1978 (No. 7)	No	
Bounty (Printed Fabrics) Act 1981	1981 (No. 102)	No	
Bounty (Refined Tin) Act 1980	1980 (No. 46)	No	
Bounty (Room Air Conditioners) Act 1983	1983 (No. 10)	No	
Bounty (Rotary Cultivators) Act 1979	1979 (No. 70)	No	
Bounty (Ship Repair) Act 1986	1986 (No. 128)	No	
Bounty (Ships) Act 1980	1980 (No. 48)	No	
Bounty (Ships) Act 1989	1989 (No. 69)	No	
Bounty (Steel Mill Products) Act 1983	1983 (No. 125)	No	
Bounty (Steel Products) Act 1983	1983 (No. 11)	No	
Bounty (Textile Yarns) Act 1981	1981 (No. 103)	No	
Bounty (Tractor Cabs) Act 1983	1983 (No. 78)	No	
Bounty (Two Stroke Engines) Act 1984	1984 (No. 66)	No	
Boy Scouts' Association Act 1924	1924 (No. 31)	Yes (as amended)	
Brachina to Leigh Creek North Coalfield Railway Act 1950	1950 (No. 75)	No	
Brigalow Lands Agreement Act 1962	1962 (No. 103)	No	
British Commonwealth Pacific Airlines Agreement Act 1947	1947 (No. 32)	No	
Broadcasting and Television Stations Licence Fees Act 1956	1956 (No. 34)	No	
Broadcasting (Limited Licences) Fees Act 1988	1988 (No. 142)	No	
Broadcasting (Retransmission Permits and Temporary Transmission Permits) Fees Act 1988	1988 (No. 143)	No	
Broadcasting Services Act 1992	1992 (No. 110)	Yes (as amended)	
Broadcasting Services (Transitional Provisions and Consequential Amendments) Act 1992	1992 (No. 105)	Yes (as amended)	
Broadcasting Stations Licence Fees Act 1964	1964 (No. 119)	No	
Budget Savings (Omnibus) Act 2016	2016 (No. 55)	Yes (as made)	
Buffalo Export Charge Act 1997	1997 (No. 209)	No	
Buffalo Slaughter Levy Act 1997	1997 (No. 210)	No	
Builders Labourers' Federation (Cancellation of Registration) Act 1986	1986 (No. 6)	Yes (as made)	
Builders Labourers' Federation (Cancellation of Registration—Consequential Provisions) Act 1986	1986 (No. 7)	Yes (as amended)	
Building and Construction Industry (Consequential and Transitional Provisions) Act 2016	2016 (No. 88)	Yes (as amended)	
Building and Construction Industry Improvement Act 2005	2005 (No. 113)	No	
Building and Construction Industry Improvement (Consequential and Transitional) Act 2005	2005 (No. 112)	Yes (as made)	
Building and Construction Industry (Improving Productivity) Act 2016	2016 (No. 87)	Yes (as amended)	
Building Energy Efficiency Disclosure Act 2010	2010 (No. 67)	Yes (as amended)	
Building Industry Act 1985	1985 (No. 92)	Yes (as amended)	
Business Names Registration Act 2011	2011 (No. 126)	Yes (as amended)	
Business Names Registration (Application of Consequential Amendments) Act 2011	2011 (No. 172)	Yes (as made)	
Business Names Registration (Fees) Act 2011	2011 (No. 128)	Yes (as made)	
Business Names Registration (Transitional and Consequential Provisions) Act 2011	2011 (No. 127)	Yes (as amended)	
Business Services Wage Assessment Tool Payment Scheme Act 2015	2015 (No. 111)	Yes (as amended)	
Butter Agreement Act 1920	1920 (No. 20)	No	
Butter Fat Levy Act 1965	1965 (No. 42)	No	
Butter Fat Levy Act (No. 2) 1965	1965 (No. 129)	No	
Butter Fat Levy Act 1972	1972 (No. 34)	No	
Cable and Wire Bounty Act 1941	1941 (No. 29)	No	
Canberra College of Advanced Education Act 1967	1967 (No. 104)	No	
Canberra Water Supply (Googong Dam) Act 1974	1974 (No. 34)	Yes (as amended)	
Cancer Australia Act 2006	2006 (No. 35)	Yes (as amended)	
Canned Fruit Bounty Act 1924	1924 (No. 2)	No	
Canned Fruit Excise Act 1963	1963 (No. 92)	No	
Canned Fruit (Sales Promotion) Act 1959	1959 (No. 83)	No	
Canned Fruits Export Charges Act 1926	1926 (No. 41)	No	
Canned Fruits Export Control Act 1926	1926 (No. 40)	No	
Canned Fruits Export Marketing Act 1963	1963 (No. 89)	No	
Canned Fruits Levy Act 1979	1979 (No. 161)	No	
Canned Fruits Levy Collection Act 1979	1979 (No. 162)	No	
Canned Fruits Marketing Act 1979	1979 (No. 160)	No	
Canning-Fruit Charge Act 1959	1959 (No. 81)	No	
Canning-Fruit Charge (Administration) Act 1959	1959 (No. 82)	No	
Canvas and Duck Bounty Act 1939	1939 (No. 73)	No	
Captains Flat (Abatement of Pollution) Agreement Act 1975	1975 (No. 121)	No	
Carbon Credits (Carbon Farming Initiative) Act 2011	2011 (No. 101)	Yes (as amended)	
Carer Recognition Act 2010	2010 (No. 123)	Yes (as made)	
Carriage by Air Act 1935	1935 (No. 18)	No	
Carriage of Goods by Sea Act 1991	1991 (No. 160)	Yes (as amended)	
Cash Transaction Reports Act 1988	1988 (No. 64)	Yes (as amended)	
Cattle and Beef Levy Collection Act 1990	1990 (No. 143)	No	
Cattle and Beef Research Act 1960	1960 (No. 6)	No	
Cattle Export Bounty Act 1924	1924 (No. 14)	No	
Cattle Export Charge Act 1990	1990 (No. 142)	No	
Cattle (Exporters) Export Charge Act 1997	1997 (No. 211)	No	
Cattle (Producers) Export Charges Act 1997	1997 (No. 212)	No	
Cattle Slaughter Levy Act 1960	1960 (No. 7)	No	
Cattle Slaughter Levy Collection Act 1960	1960 (No. 8)	No	
Cattle Slaughter Levy (Suspension) Act 1961	1961 (No. 49)	No	
Cattle Transaction Levy Act 1990	1990 (No. 125)	No	
Cattle Transaction Levy Act 1995	1995 (No. 73)	No	
Cattle Transactions Levy Act 1997	1997 (No. 213)	No	
Cellulose Acetate Flake Bounty Act 1956	1956 (No. 38)	No	
Census and Statistics Act 1905	1905 (No. 15)	Yes (as amended)	
CFM Sale Act 1996	1996 (No. 58)	Yes (as amended)	
Charities Act 2013	2013 (No. 100)	Yes (as made)	
Charities (Consequential Amendments and Transitional Provisions) Act 2013	2013 (No. 96)	Yes (as amended)	
Charter of Budget Honesty Act 1998	1998 (No. 22)	Yes (as amended)	
Charter of the United Nations Act 1945	1945 (No. 32)	Yes (as amended)	
Chemical Weapons (Prohibition) Act 1994	1994 (No. 26)	Yes (as amended)	
Cheques and Payment Orders Act 1986	1986 (No. 145)	Yes (as amended)	
Chicken Meat Research Act 1969	1969 (No. 35)	No	
Chief Justice's Pension Act 1918	1918 (No. 38)	No	
Child Care Act 1972	1972 (No. 121)	Yes (as amended)	
Child Care Payments Act 1997	1997 (No. 195)	No	
Child Care Payments (Consequential Amendments and Transitional Provisions) Act 1997	1997 (No. 196)	No	
Child Endowment Act 1941	1941 (No. 8)	No	
Child Support Act 1988	1988 (No. 3)	Yes (as amended)	
Child Support and Family Assistance Legislation Amendment (Budget and Other Measures) Act 2010	2010 (No. 65)	Yes (as made)	
Child Support (Assessment) Act 1989	1989 (No. 124)	Yes (as amended)	
Child Support Legislation Amendment (Reform of the Child Support Scheme—Initial Measures) Act 2006	2006 (No. 53)	Yes (as amended)	
Child Support Legislation Amendment (Reform of the Child Support Scheme—New Formula and Other Measures) Act 2006	2006 (No. 146)	Yes (as amended)	
Childcare Rebate Act 1993	1993 (No. 112)	No	
Children's Commission Act 1975	1975 (No. 51)	No	
Chowilla Reservoir Agreement Act 1963	1963 (No. 100)	No	
Christmas Island Act 1958	1958 (No. 41)	Yes (as amended)	
Christmas Island Agreement Act 1949	1949 (No. 87)	No	
Christmas Island Agreement Act 1958	1958 (No. 69)	Yes (as amended)	
Christmas Island Agreement Act 1976	1976 (No. 118)	Yes (as made)	
Christmas Island (Request and Consent) Act 1957	1957 (No. 102)	No	
Circuit Layouts Act 1989	1989 (No. 28)	Yes (as amended)	
Cities Commission (Repeal) Act 1975	1975 (No. 120)	No	
Citrus Fruits Bounty Act 1937	1937 (No. 38)	No	
Citrus Fruits Bounty Act 1938	1938 (No. 22)	No	
Civil Aviation Act 1988	1988 (No. 63)	Yes (as amended)	
Civil Aviation Agreement Act 1952	1952 (No. 100)	No	
Civil Aviation (Carriers' Liability) Act 1959	1959 (No. 2)	Yes (as amended	
Civil Aviation (Damage by Aircraft) Act 1958	1958 (No. 81)	No	
Civil Aviation Legislation Amendment Act 1995	1995 (No. 82)	Yes (as made)	
Civil Aviation (Offenders on International Aircraft) Act 1970	1970 (No. 17)	No	
Civil Dispute Resolution Act 2011	2011 (No. 17)	Yes (as amended)	
Civil Nuclear Transfers to India Act 2016	2016 (No. 101)	Yes (as made)	
Claims against the Commonwealth Act 1902	1902 (No. 21)	No	
Classification (Publications, Films and Computer Games) Act 1995	1995 (No. 7)	Yes (as amended)	
Clean Energy Act 2011	2011 (No. 131)	No	
Clean Energy (Charges—Customs) Act 2011	2011 (No. 153)	No	
Clean Energy (Charges—Excise) Act 2011	2011 (No. 154)	No	
Clean Energy Finance Corporation Act 2012	2012 (No. 104)	Yes (as amended)	
Clean Energy (International Unit Surrender Charge) Act 2011	2011 (No. 158)	No	
Clean Energy Legislation (Carbon Tax Repeal) Act 2014	2014 (No. 83)	Yes (as amended)	
Clean Energy Regulator Act 2011	2011 (No. 163)	Yes (as amended)	
Clean Energy (Unit Issue Charge—Auctions) Act 2011	2011 (No. 160)	No	
Clean Energy (Unit Issue Charge—Fixed Charge) Act 2011	2011 (No. 161)	No	
Clean Energy (Unit Shortfall Charge—General) Act 2011	2011 (No. 162)	No	
Climate Change Authority Act 2011	2011 (No. 43)	Yes (as amended)	
Close Corporations Act 1989	1989 (No. 120)	No	
Close Corporations (Additional Liquidators' Recovery Trust Fund Contribution) Act 1989	1989 (No. 123)	No	
Close Corporations (Fees) Act 1989	1989 (No. 121)	No	
Close Corporations (Liquidators' Recovery Trust Fund Contribution) Act 1989	1989 (No. 122)	No	
COAG Reform Fund Act 2008	2008 (No. 156)	Yes (as amended)	
Coal Excise Act 1949	1949 (No. 81)	No	
Coal Industry Act 1946	1946 (No. 40)	No	
Coal Industry Act 1955	1955 (No. 53)	No	
Coal Industry Repeal Act 2001	2001 (No. 32)	Yes (as made)	
Coal Industry Repeal (Validation of Proclamation) Act 2002	2002 (No. 20)	Yes (as made)	
Coal Industry (Tasmania) Act 1949	1949 (No. 84)	No	
Coal Loading Works Agreement (New South Wales) Act 1961	1961 (No. 93)	No	
Coal Loading Works Agreement (Queensland) Act 1962	1962 (No. 45)	No	
Coal Mines Profits (War-time) Act 1944	1944 (No. 2)	No	
Coal Mining Industry (Long Service Leave Funding) Act 1992	1992 (No. 60)	Yes (as amended)	
Coal Mining Industry (Long Service Leave) Legislation Amendment Act 2011	2011 (No. 142)	Yes (as made)	
Coal Mining Industry (Long Service Leave) Payroll Levy Act 1992	1992 (No. 62)	Yes (as amended)	
Coal Mining Industry (Long Service Leave) Payroll Levy Collection Act 1992	1992 (No. 61)	Yes (as amended)	
Coal Production (War-time) Act 1944	1944 (No. 1)	No	
Coal Production (War-time) Act Repeal Act 1948	1948 (No. 80)	No	
Coal Research Assistance Act 1977	1977 (No. 135)	Yes (as amended)	
Coarse Grains Levy Act 1992	1992 (No. 19)	No	
Coarse Grains Levy (Consequential Provisions) Act 1992	1992 (No. 20)	No	
Coastal Trading (Revitalising Australian Shipping) Act 2012	2012 (No. 55)	Yes (as amended)	
Coastal Trading (Revitalising Australian Shipping) (Consequential Amendments and Transitional Provisions) Act 2012	2012 (No. 56)	Yes (as made)	
Coastal Waters (Northern Territory Powers) Act 1980	1980 (No. 76)	Yes (as amended)	
Coastal Waters (Northern Territory Title) Act 1980	1980 (No. 78)	Yes (as made)	
Coastal Waters (State Powers) Act 1980	1980 (No. 75)	Yes (as amended)	
Coastal Waters (State Title) Act 1980	1980 (No. 77)	Yes (as made)	
Cockatoo and Schnapper Islands Act 1949	1949 (No. 30)	Yes (as amended)	
Cockatoo Island Dockyard Agreement Act 1933	1933 (No. 73)	No	
Cocos (Keeling) Islands Act 1955	1955 (No. 34)	Yes (as amended)	
Cocos (Keeling) Islands (Request and Consent) Act 1954	1954 (No. 76)	No	
Coinage Act 1909	1909 (No. 6)	No	
Colonial Light Dues Collection Act 1932	1932 (No. 65)	No	
Colonial Light Dues Legislation Repeal Act 1960	1960 (No. 12)	No	
Colonial Light Dues (Rates) Act 1932	1932 (No. 66)	No	
Combating the Financing of People Smuggling and Other Measures Act 2011	2011 (No. 60)	Yes (as made)	
Commerce (Trade Descriptions) Act 1905	1905 (No. 16)	Yes (as amended)	
Commercial Activities Act 1919	1919 (No. 3)	No	
Commercial Broadcasting Stations Licence Fees Act 1942	1942 (No. 34)	No	
Commercial Broadcasting (Tax) Act 2017	2017 (No. 110)	Yes (as made)	
Commission on Advanced Education Act 1973	1973 (No. 177)	No	
Committee of Public Accounts Act 1913	1913 (No. 19)	No	
Committee of Public Accounts Act 1917	1917 (No. 27)	No	
Committee of Public Accounts Act 1932	1932 (No. 58)	No	
Common Informers (Parliamentary Disqualifications) Act 1975	1975 (No. 28)	Yes (as amended)	
Commonwealth Aid Roads Act 1950	1950 (No. 47)	No	
Commonwealth Aid Roads Act 1954	1954 (No. 57)	No	
Commonwealth Aid Roads Act 1959	1959 (No. 39)	No	
Commonwealth Aid Roads Act 1964	1964 (No. 32)	No	
Commonwealth Aid Roads Act 1969	1969 (No. 41)	No	
Commonwealth Aid Roads and Works Act 1947	1947 (No. 17)	No	
Commonwealth Aid Roads (Special Assistance) Act 1957	1957 (No. 83)	No	
Commonwealth and State Housing Agreement Act 1945	1945 (No. 44)	No	
Commonwealth and State Housing Agreement Act 1955	1955 (No. 12)	No	
Commonwealth and State Housing Agreement (Service Personnel) Act 1990	1991 (No. 15)	No	
Commonwealth Authorities and Companies Act 1997	1997 (No. 153)	No	
Commonwealth Authorities (Australian Capital Territory Pay-roll Tax) Act 1995	1995 (No. 96)	Yes (as amended)	
Commonwealth Authorities (Northern Territory Pay-roll Tax) Act 1979	1979 (No. 2)	Yes (as amended)	
Commonwealth Bank Act 1911	1911 (No. 18)	No	
Commonwealth Bank Act 1945	1945 (No. 13)	No	
Commonwealth Bank Sale Act 1995	1995 (No. 161)	Yes (as amended)	
Commonwealth Banks Act 1959	1959 (No. 5)	Yes (as amended)	
Commonwealth Banks Act 1973	1973 (No. 18)	Yes (as made)	
Commonwealth Banks Restructuring Act 1990	1990 (No. 118)	Yes (as amended)	
Commonwealth Borrowing Levy Act 1987	1987 (No. 114)	No	
Commonwealth Borrowing Levy Collection Act 1987	1987 (No. 115)	No	
Commonwealth Bureau of Roads Act 1964	1964 (No. 65)	No	
Commonwealth Bureau of Roads (Repeal) Act 1977	1977 (No. 27)	No	
Commonwealth Conciliation and Arbitration Act 1904	1904 (No. 13)	No	
Commonwealth Conciliation and Arbitration Act 1910	1910 (No. 7)	No	
Commonwealth Debt Conversion Act 1931	1931 (No. 18)	No	
Commonwealth Debt Conversion Act (No. 2) 1931	1932 (No. 1)	No	
Commonwealth Electoral Act 1902	1902 (No. 19)	No	
Commonwealth Electoral Act 1918	1918 (No. 27)	Yes (as amended)	
Commonwealth Electoral Legislation (Provision of Information) Act 2000	2000 (No. 127)	Yes (as made)	
Commonwealth Electoral (Redistribution) Act 1977	1977 (No. 117)	No	
Commonwealth Electoral (War-time) Act 1917	1917 (No. 8)	No	
Commonwealth Electoral (War-time) Act 1940	1940 (No. 48)	No	
Commonwealth Electoral (War-time) Repeal Act 1920	1920 (No. 44)	No	
Commonwealth Employees' Compensation Act 1930	1930 (No. 24)	No	
Commonwealth Employees (Employment Provisions) Act 1977	1977 (No. 85)	No	
Commonwealth Employees' Furlough Act 1943	1943 (No. 19)	No	
Commonwealth Employees (Redeployment and Retirement) Act 1979	1979 (No 52)	No	
Commonwealth Employees' Rehabilitation and Compensation Act 1988	1988 (No. 75)	Yes (as amended)	
Commonwealth Employment Service Act 1978	1978 (No. 102)	No	
Commonwealth Franchise Act 1902	1902 (No. 8)	No	
Commonwealth Functions (Statutes Review) Act 1981	1981 (No. 74)	Yes (as amended)	
Commonwealth Funds Management Limited Act 1990	1991 (No. 13)	Yes (as amended)	
Commonwealth Grants Commission Act 1933	1933 (No. 3)	No	
Commonwealth Guarantees (Charges) Act 1987	1987 (No. 10)	No	
Commonwealth Housing Act 1927	1927 (No. 35)	No	
Commonwealth Inscribed Stock Act 1911	1911 (No. 20)	Yes (as amended)	
Commonwealth Legal Aid Commission Act 1977	1977 (No. 80)	No	
Commonwealth Motor Vehicles (Liability) Act 1959	1959 (No. 94)	Yes (as amended)	
Commonwealth Observatory Trust Fund Act 1953	1953 (No. 41)	No	
Commonwealth Places (Application of Laws) Act 1970	1970 (No. 121)	Yes (as amended)	
Commonwealth Places (Mirror Taxes) Act 1998	1998 (No. 24)	Yes (as amended)	
Commonwealth Places Windfall Tax (Collection) Act 1998	1998 (No. 25)	Yes (as made)	
Commonwealth Places Windfall Tax (Imposition) Act 1998	1998 (No. 26)	Yes (as made)	
Commonwealth Police Act 1957	1957 (No. 85)	No	
Commonwealth Prisoners Act 1967	1967 (No. 58)	No	
Commonwealth Public Service Act 1902	1902 (No. 5)	No	
Commonwealth Public Service Act 1909	1909 (No. 25)	No	
Commonwealth Public Service Act 1922	1922 (No. 21)	No	
Commonwealth Public Service Act 1947	1947 (No. 1)	No	
Commonwealth Public Service Act 1948	1948 (No. 35)	No	
Commonwealth Public Service (Acting Commissioner) Act 1916	1916 (No. 9)	No	
Commonwealth Public Works Committee Act 1913	1913 (No. 20)	No	
Commonwealth Public Works Committee Act 1917	1917 (No. 26)	No	
Commonwealth Radioactive Waste Management Act 2005	2005 (No. 145)	No	
Commonwealth Railways Act 1917	1917 (No. 31)	No	
Commonwealth Salaries Act 1907	1907 (No. 7)	No	
Commonwealth Serum Laboratories Act 1961	1961 (No. 38)	Yes (as amended)	
Commonwealth Services Delivery Agency Act 1997	1997 (No. 31)	Yes (as amended)	
Commonwealth Shipping Act 1923	1923 (No. 3)	No	
Commonwealth Teaching Service Act 1972	1972 (No. 13)	Yes (as amended)	
Commonwealth Vehicles (Registration and Exemption from Taxation) Act 1997	1997 (No. 111)	Yes (as amended)	
Commonwealth Volunteers Protection Act 2003	2003 (No. 2)	Yes (as amended)	
Commonwealth Workmen's Compensation Act 1912	1912 (No. 29)	No	
Communist Party Dissolution Act 1950	1950 (No. 16)	No	
Community Employment Act 1983	1983 (No. 34)	No	
Companies (Acquisition of Shares) Act 1980	1980 (No. 64)	No	
Companies (Acquisition of Shares—Fees) Act 1980	1980 (No. 65)	No	
Companies (Acquisition of Shares—Fees: Taxation Component) Act 1989	1989 (No. 102)	No	
Companies Act 1981	1981 (No. 89)	No	
Companies and Securities (Interpretation and Miscellaneous Provisions) Act 1980	1980 (No. 68)	No	
Companies (Fees) Act 1981	1981 (No. 90)	No	
Companies (Fees: Taxation Component) Act 1989	1989 (No. 101)	No	
Companies (Foreign Take-overs) Act 1972	1972 (No. 134)	No	
Companies (Transitional Provisions) Act 1981	1981 (No. 91)	No	
Compensation (Commonwealth Employees) Act 1971	1971 (No. 48)	No	
Compensation (Japanese Internment) Act 2001	2001 (No. 41)	Yes (as amended)	
Competition Policy Reform Act 1995	1995 (No. 88)	Yes (as made)	
Complaints (Australian Federal Police) Act 1981	1981 (No. 21)	No	
Comprehensive Nuclear Test-Ban Treaty Act 1998	1998 (No. 78)	Yes (as amended)	
Compulsory Voting Act 1915	1915 (No. 36)	No	
ComSuper Act 2011	2011 (No. 57)	No	
Conciliation and Arbitration Act 1950	1950 (No. 20)	No	
Conciliation and Arbitration Act 1951	1951 (No. 1)	No	
Conciliation and Arbitration Act 1976	1976 (No. 3)	No	
Conciliation and Arbitration (Electricity Industry) Act 1985	1985 (No. 50)	No	
Consolidated Revenue [No. 1]	1901 (No. 1)	No	
Consolidated Revenue [No. 2]	1901 (No. 3)	No	
Consolidated Revenue [No. 3]	1901 (No. 10)	No	
Consolidated Revenue [No. 4]	1901 (No. 15)	No	
Consolidated Revenue [No. 5]	1902 (No. 1)	No	
Consolidated Revenue [No. 6]	1902 (No. 2)	No	
Consolidated Revenue [No. 7]	1902 (No. 4)	No	
Consolidated Revenue [No. 8]	1902 (No. 6)	No	
Consolidated Revenue [No. 9]	1902 (No. 9)	No	
Consolidated Revenue [No. 10]	1902 (No. 10)	No	
Consolidated Revenue [No. 11]	1902 (No. 15)	No	
Constitution Alteration (Social Services) 1946	1946 (No. 81)	Yes (as made)	
Constitutional Convention (Election) Act 1997	1997 (No. 128)	No	
Construction Industry Reform and Development Act 1992	1992 (No. 33)	No	
Consular Fees Act 1955	1955 (No. 5)	Yes (as amended)	
Consular Privileges and Immunities Act 1972	1972 (No. 62)	Yes (as amended)	
Continental Shelf (Living Natural Resources) Act 1968	1968 (No. 149)	No	
Contract Immigrants Act 1905	1905 (No. 19)	No	
Control of Naval Waters Act 1918	1918 (No. 28)	Yes (as amended)	
Co-operative Farmers and Graziers Direct Meat Supply Limited (Loan Guarantee) Act 1978	1978 (No. 16)	Yes (as amended)	
Co-operative Scheme Legislation Amendment Act 1989	1989 (No. 92)	No	
Coordinator-General for Remote Indigenous Services Act 2009	2009 (No. 68)	No	
Copper and Brass Strip Bounty Act 1962	1962 (No. 81)	No	
Copper Bounty Act 1958	1958 (No. 78)	No	
Copyright Act 1905	1905 (No. 25)	No	
Copyright Act 1912	1912 (No. 20)	No	
Copyright Act 1968	1968 (No. 63)	Yes (as amended)	
Coral Sea Islands Act 1969	1969 (No. 58)	Yes (as amended)	
Coronation Celebration Act 1902	1902 (No. 3)	No	
Coronavirus Economic Response Package (Payments and Benefits) Act 2020	2020 (No. 37)	Yes (as made)	
Corporate Law Reform Act 1992	1992 (No. 210)	Yes (as made)	
Corporations (Aboriginal and Torres Strait Islander) Act 2006	2006 (No. 124)	Yes (as amended)	
Corporations (Aboriginal and Torres Strait Islander) Consequential, Transitional and Other Measures Act 2006	2006 (No. 125)	Yes (as amended)	
Corporations Act 1989	1989 (No. 106)	No	
Corporations Act 2001	2001 (No. 50)	Yes (as amended)	
Corporations (Compensation Arrangements Levies) Act 2001	2001 (No. 106)	Yes (as made)	
Corporations (Fees) Act 1989	1989 (No. 110)	No	
Corporations (Fees) Act 2001	2001 (No. 52)	Yes (as amended)	
Corporations (Futures Organisations Levies) Act 2001	2001 (No. 53)	No	
Corporations (National Guarantee Fund Levies) Act 2001	2001 (No. 54)	Yes (as amended)	
Corporations (Repeals, Consequentials and Transitionals) Act 2001	2001 (No. 55)	Yes (as amended)	
Corporations (Review Fees) Act 2003	2003 (No. 23)	Yes (as amended)	
Corporations (Securities Exchanges Levies) Act 2001	2001 (No. 56)	No	
Cotton Bounty Act 1926	1926 (No. 51)	No	
Cotton Bounty Act 1951	1951 (No. 39)	No	
Cotton Industries Bounty Act 1930	1930 (No. 13)	No	
Cotton Levy Act 1982	1982 (No. 147)	No	
Cotton Research Act 1982	1982 (No. 146)	No	
Council for Aboriginal Reconciliation Act 1991	1991 (No. 127)	No	
Counter-Terrorism (Temporary Exclusion Orders) Act 2019	2019 (No. 53)	Yes (as made)	
Court Security Act 2013	2013 (No. 128)	Yes (as amended)	
Courts-Martial Appeals Act 1955	1955 (No. 16)	Yes (as amended)	
Crimes Act 1914	1914 (No. 12)	Yes (as amended)	
Crimes (Aircraft) Act 1963	1963 (No. 64)	No	
Crimes at Sea Act 1979	1979 (No. 17)	No	
Crimes at Sea Act 2000	2000 (No. 13)	Yes (as amended)	
Crimes (Aviation) Act 1991	1991 (No. 139)	Yes (as amended)	
Crimes (Biological Weapons) Act 1976	1977 (No. 11)	Yes (as amended)	
Crimes (Currency) Act 1981	1981 (No. 122)	Yes (as amended)	
Crimes (Foreign Incursions and Recruitment) Act 1978	1978 (No. 13)	No	
Crimes (Hijacking of Aircraft) Act 1972	1972 (No. 101)	No	
Crimes (Hostages) Act 1989	1989 (No. 26)	Yes (as amended)	
Crimes (Internationally Protected Persons) Act 1976	1977 (No. 8)	Yes (as amended)	
Crimes (Overseas) Act 1964	1964 (No. 116)	Yes (as amended)	
Crimes (Protection of Aircraft) Act 1973	1973 (No. 34)	No	
Crimes (Ships and Fixed Platforms) Act 1992	1992 (No. 173)	Yes (as amended)	
Crimes (Superannuation Benefits) Act 1989	1989 (No. 145)	Yes (as amended)	
Crimes (Taxation Offences) Act 1980	1980 (No. 156)	Yes (as amended)	
Crimes (Torture) Act 1988	1988 (No. 148)	No	
Crimes (Traffic in Narcotic Drugs and Psychotropic Substances) Act 1990	1990 (No. 97)	Yes (as amended)	
Criminal Code Act 1995	1995 (No. 12)	Yes (as amended)	
Criminology Research Act 1971	1971 (No. 15)	Yes (as amended)	
Cross-Border Insolvency Act 2008	2008 (No. 24)	Yes (as amended)	
Crown Debts (Priority) Act 1981	1981 (No. 93)	Yes (as amended)	
CSL Sale Act 1993	1993 (No. 88)	Yes (as amended)	
Currency Act 1963	1963 (No. 67)	No	
Currency Act 1965	1965 (No. 95)	Yes (as amended)	
Curriculum Development Centre Act 1975	1975 (No. 41)	No	
Customs Act 1901	1901 (No. 6)	Yes (as amended)	
Customs Administration Act 1985	1985 (No. 38)	No	
Customs Depot Licensing Charges Act 1997	1997 (No. 4)	Yes (as amended)	
Customs Legislation Amendment (Application of International Trade Modernisation and Other Measures) Act 2004	2004 (No. 25)	Yes (as amended)	
Customs Legislation (Anti-dumping Amendments) Act 1998	1998 (No. 79)	No	
Customs Securities (Penalties) Act 1981	1981 (No. 46)	Yes (as amended)	
Customs Undertakings (Penalties) Act 1981	1981 (No. 47)	Yes (as amended)	
Dairy Adjustment Act 1974	1974 (No. 166)	No	
Dairy Adjustment Levy (Customs) Act 2000	2000 (No. 19)	No	
Dairy Adjustment Levy (Excise) Act 2000	2000 (No. 20)	No	
Dairy Adjustment Levy (General) Act 2000	2000 (No. 21)	No	
Dairy Adjustment Levy Termination Act 2008	2008 (No. 123)	Yes (as made)	
Dairy Industry Adjustment Act 2000	2000 (No. 22)	Yes (as made)	
Dairy Industry Assistance Act 1977	1977 (No. 54)	No	
Dairy Industry Assistance Levy Act 1977	1977 (No. 55)	No	
Dairy Industry Service Reform Act 2003	2003 (No. 32)	Yes (as amended)	
Dairy Industry Stabilization Act 1977	1977 (No. 51)	No	
Dairy Industry Stabilization Levy Act 1977	1977 (No. 52)	No	
Dairy Industry Stabilization Levy (Termination of Levy) Act 1986	1986 (No. 57)	No	
Dairy Legislation (Transitional Provisions and Consequential Amendments) Act 1986	1986 (No. 59)	No	
Dairy Produce Act 1933	1933 (No. 58)	No	
Dairy Produce Act 1986	1986 (No. 54)	Yes (as amended)	
Dairy Produce Export Charges Act 1924	1924 (No. 39)	No	
Dairy Produce Export Control Act 1924	1924 (No. 38)	No	
Dairy Produce Levy Act 1958	1958 (No. 75)	No	
Dairy Produce Levy (No. 1) Act 1986	1986 (No. 55)	No	
Dairy Produce Levy (No. 2) Act 1986	1986 (No. 56)	No	
Dairy Produce Market Support Levy Act 1985	1985 (No. 51)	No	
Dairy Produce Research and Sales Promotion Act 1958	1958 (No. 73)	No	
Dairy Produce Sales Promotion Act 1975	1975 (No. 83)	No	
Dairy Products (Export Inspection Charge) Act 1982	1982 (No. 10)	No	
Dairy Products (Export Inspection Charge) Collection Act 1982	1982 (No. 11)	No	
Dairying Industry Act 1952	1952 (No. 97)	No	
Dairying Industry Act 1957	1957 (No. 31)	No	
Dairying Industry Act 1962	1962 (No. 46)	No	
Dairying Industry Act 1967	1967 (No. 23)	No	
Dairying Industry Assistance Act 1942	1942 (No. 58)	No	
Dairying Industry Assistance Act 1943	1943 (No. 37)	No	
Dairying Industry Equalization Act 1970	1970 (No. 45)	No	
Dairying Industry Equalization Legislation Referendum Act 1970	1970 (No. 46)	No	
Dairying Industry Levy Act 1970	1970 (No. 43)	No	
Dairying Industry Levy Collection Act 1970	1970 (No. 44)	No	
Dairying Industry Research and Promotion Levy Collection Act 1978	1978 (No. 139)	No	
Dairying Research Act 1972	1972 (No. 30)	No	
Dairying Research Levy Act 1972	1972 (No. 31)	No	
Dairying Research Levy Collection Act 1972	1972 (No. 32)	No	
Damage by Aircraft Act 1999	1999 (No. 107)	Yes (as amended)	
Dartmouth Reservoir Agreement Act 1970	1970 (No. 7)	No	
Darwin Cyclone Damage Compensation Act 1975	1975 (No. 43)	No	
Darwin Lands Acquisition Act 1945	1945 (No. 24)	No	
Darwin Reconstruction Act 1975	1975 (No. 2)	No	
Datacasting Charge (Imposition) Act 1998	1998 (No. 98)	No	
Datacasting Transmitter Licence Fees Act 2006	2006 (No. 154)	No	
Data-matching Program (Assistance and Tax) Act 1990	1991 (No. 20)	Yes (as amended)	
Daylight Saving Act 1916	1916 (No. 40)	No	
Death Penalty Abolition Act 1973	1973 (No. 100)	Yes (as amended)	
Debt Conversion Agreement Act 1931	1931 (No. 14)	No	
Debt Conversion Agreement Act (No. 2) 1931	1931 (No. 52)	No	
Deceased Soldiers' Estates Act 1918	1918 (No. 44)	No	
Deer Export Charge Act 1992	1992 (No. 31)	No	
Deer Slaughter Levy Act 1992	1992 (No. 30)	No	
Deer Velvet Export Charge Act 1992	1992 (No. 28)	No	
Deer Velvet Levy Act 1992	1992 (No. 29)	No	
Defence Act 1903	1903 (No. 20)	Yes (as amended)	
Defence (Citizen Military Forces) Act 1943	1943 (No. 2)	No	
Defence (Civil Employment) Act 1918	1918 (No. 17)	No	
Defence Equipment Act 1924	1924 (No. 18)	No	
Defence Equipment Act 1926	1926 (No. 25)	No	
Defence Equipment Act 1928	1928 (No. 6)	No	
Defence Equipment Act 1934	1934 (No. 20)	No	
Defence Equipment Act 1936	1936 (No. 55)	No	
Defence Equipment Act 1938	1938 (No. 73)	No	
Defence Equipment Act 1939	1939 (No. 25)	No	
Defence Equipment Act 1940	1940 (No. 67)	No	
Defence Force Discipline Act 1982	1982 (No. 152)	Yes (as amended)	
Defence Force (Home Loans Assistance) Act 1990	1991 (No. 14)	Yes (as amended)	
Defence Force (Papua New Guinea) Retirement Benefits Act 1973	1973 (No. 86)	No	
Defence Force Protection Act 1967	1967 (No. 57)	No	
Defence Force Re-organization Act 1975	1975 (No. 96)	No	
Defence Force Retirement and Death Benefits Act 1973	1973 (No. 81)	Yes (as amended)	
Defence Force Retirement and Death Benefits (Pension Increases) Act 1974	1974 (No. 105)	Yes (as made)	
Defence Force Retirement and Death Benefits (Pension Increases) Act 1976	1976 (No. 34)	Yes (as amended)	
Defence Forces Retirement Benefits Act 1948	1948 (No. 31)	Yes (as amended)	
Defence Forces Retirement Benefits Act 1959	1959 (No. 103)	No	
Defence Forces Retirement Benefits Act 1971	1971 (No. 47)	No	
Defence Forces Retirement Benefits Fund (Distribution of Surplus to Pensioners) Act 1976	1976 (No. 128)	No	
Defence Forces Retirement Benefits (Pension Increases) Act 1961	1961 (No. 87)	Yes (as amended)	
Defence Forces Retirement Benefits (Pension Increases) Act 1967	1967 (No. 91)	Yes (as amended)	
Defence Forces Retirement Benefits (Pension Increases) Act 1971	1971 (No. 74)	Yes (as amended)	
Defence Forces Retirement Benefits (Pension Increases) Act 1973	1973 (No. 85)	Yes (as made)	
Defence Forces Special Retirement Benefits Act 1960	1960 (No. 68)	Yes (as amended)	
Defence Home Ownership Assistance Scheme Act 2008	2008 (No. 27)	Yes (as amended)	
Defence Housing Authority Act 1987	1987 (No. 101)	Yes (as amended)	
Defence Lands Purchase Act 1913	1913 (No. 18)	No	
Defence Legislation Amendment Act 2011	2011 (No. 183)	Yes (as made)	
Defence Legislation Amendment (Enhancement of the Reserves and Modernisation) Act 2001	2001 (No. 10)	Yes (as amended)	
Defence (Parliamentary Candidates) Act 1966	1966 (No. 87)	No	
Defence (Parliamentary Candidates) Act 1969	1969 (No. 60)	Yes (as amended)	
Defence Pay Act 1961	1961 (No. 34)	No	
Defence Pay Act 1971	1971 (No. 2)	No	
Defence Preparations Act 1951	1951 (No. 20)	No	
Defence (Re-establishment) Act 1965	1965 (No. 54)	No	
Defence Reserve Service (Protection) Act 2001	2001 (No. 11)	Yes (as amended)	
Defence Retirement Act 1922	1922 (No. 9)	No	
Defence (Road Transport Legislation Exemption) Act 2006	2006 (No. 4)	Yes (as made)	
Defence (Special Undertakings) Act 1952	1952 (No. 19)	Yes (as amended)	
Defence Trade Controls Act 2012	2012 (No. 153)	Yes (as amended)	
Defence Transition (Residual Provisions) Act 1952	1952 (No. 104)	No	
Defence (Transitional Provisions) Act 1946	1946 (No. 77)	No	
Defence (Visiting Forces) Act 1939	1939 (No. 5)	No	
Defence (Visiting Forces) Act 1963	1963 (No. 81)	Yes (as amended)	
Delivered Meals Subsidy Act 1970	1970 (No. 5)	No	
Dental Benefits Act 2008	2008 (No. 41)	Yes (as amended)	
Departure Tax Act 1978	1978 (No. 118)	Yes (as amended)	
Departure Tax Collection Act 1978	1978 (No. 119)	Yes (as amended)	
Derby Jetty Agreement Act 1962	1962 (No. 88)	No	
Designs Act 1906	1906 (No. 4)	No	
Designs Act 2003	2003 (No. 147)	Yes (as amended)	
Development Allowance Authority Act 1992	1992 (No. 99)	No	
Development and Migration Act 1926	1926 (No. 29)	No	
Diesel and Alternative Fuels Grants Scheme Act 1999	1999 (No. 88)	No	
Diesel Fuel Tax Act (No. 1) 1957	1957 (No. 96)	No	
Diesel Fuel Tax Act (No. 2) 1957	1957 (No. 97)	No	
Diesel Fuel Taxation (Administration) Act 1957	1957 (No. 98)	No	
Diplomatic and Consular Missions Act 1978	1978 (No. 98)	Yes (as amended)	
Diplomatic Immunities Act 1952	1952 (No. 67)	No	
Diplomatic Privileges and Immunities Act 1967	1967 (No. 16)	Yes (as amended)	
Director of Public Prosecutions Act 1983	1983 (No. 113)	Yes (as amended)	
Disability Discrimination Act 1992	1992 (No. 135)	Yes (as amended)	
Disability Services Act 1986	1986 (No. 129)	Yes (as amended)	
DisabilityCare Australia Fund Act 2013	2013 (No. 37)	Yes (as amended)	
Disabled Persons Accommodation Act 1963	1963 (No. 63)	No	
Distillation Act 1901	1901 (No. 8)	No	
Diverted Profits Tax Act 2017	2017 (No. 21)	Yes (as made)	
Do Not Call Register Act 2006	2006 (No. 88)	Yes (as amended)	
Domestic Meat Premises Charge Act 1993	1993 (No. 100)	No	
Domicile Act 1982	1982 (No. 1)	Yes (as amended)	
Dried Fruit Advances Act 1924	1924 (No. 20)	No	
Dried Fruit (Export Inspection Charge) Act 1981	1981 (No. 59)	No	
Dried Fruit (Export Inspection Charge) Collection Act 1981	1981 (No. 60)	No	
Dried Fruits Act 1928	1928 (No. 11)	No	
Dried Fruits Export Charges Act 1924	1924 (No. 41)	No	
Dried Fruits Export Control Act 1924	1924 (No. 40)	No	
Dried Fruits Levy Act 1971	1971 (No. 19)	No	
Dried Fruits Levy Collection Act 1971	1971 (No. 20)	No	
Dried Fruits Research Act 1971	1971 (No. 21)	No	
Dried Sultana Production Underwriting Act 1982	1982 (No. 6)	No	
Dried Vine Fruits Contributory Charges Act 1964	1964 (No. 43)	No	
Dried Vine Fruits Contributory Charges (Collection) Act 1964	1964 (No. 44)	No	
Dried Vine Fruits Equalization Act 1978	1978 (No. 195)	No	
Dried Vine Fruits Equalization Levy Act 1978	1978 (No. 194)	No	
Dried Vine Fruits Levy Act 1971	1971 (No. 131)	No	
Dried Vine Fruits Levy Collection Act 1971	1971 (No. 132)	No	
Dried Vine Fruits (Rate of Primary Industry (Customs) Charge) Validation Act 2001	2001 (No. 69)	No	
Dried Vine Fruits (Rate of Primary Industry (Excise) Levy) Validation Act 2001	2001 (No. 70)	No	
Dried Vine Fruits Stabilization Act 1964	1964 (No. 42)	No	
Dried Vine Fruits Stabilization Act 1971	1971 (No. 133)	No	
Dried Vine Fruits Stabilization Legislation Repeal Act 1981	1981 (No 13)	No	
Drought Assistance (Primary Producers) Act 1982	1982 (No. 99)	No	
Early Years Quality Fund Special Account Act 2013	2013 (No. 110)	Yes (as amended)	
Economic Planning Advisory Council Act 1983	1983 (No. 26)	No	
Economic Research Act 1929	1929 (No. 9)	No	
Edible Oils (Export Inspection Charge) Act 1982	1982 (No. 12)	No	
Edible Oils (Export Inspection Charge) Collection Act 1982	1982 (No. 13)	No	
Education Act 1945	1945 (No. 55)	No	
Education Research Act 1970	1970 (No. 112)	No	
Education Services for Overseas Students Act 2000	2000 (No. 164)	Yes (as amended)	
Education Services for Overseas Students (Assurance Fund Contributions) Act 2000	2000 (No. 165)	No	
Education Services for Overseas Students (Consequential and Transitional) Act 2000	2000 (No. 166)	Yes (as made)	
Education Services for Overseas Students Legislation Amendment (Tuition Protection Service and Other Measures) Act 2012	2012 (No. 9)	Yes (as amended)	
Education Services for Overseas Students (Registration Charges) Act 1997	1997 (No. 18)	Yes (as amended)	
Education Services for Overseas Students (Registration of Providers and Financial Regulation) Act 1991	1991 (No. 114)	No	
Education Services for Overseas Students (TPS Levies) Act 2012	2012 (No. 11)	Yes (as amended)	
Egg Export Charges Act 1947	1947 (No. 77)	No	
Egg Export Control Act 1947	1947 (No. 76)	No	
Egg Export Control Act 1950	1950 (No. 63)	No	
Egg Export Legislation Repeal Act 1984	1984 (No. 159)	No	
Egg Industry Research (Hen Quota) Levy Act 1987	1987 (No. 70)	No	
Egg Industry Research (Hen Quota) Levy Collection Act 1987	1987 (No. 84)	No	
Egg Industry Service Provision Act 2002	2002 (No. 116)	Yes (as amended)	
Egg Industry Service Provision (Transitional and Consequential Provisions) Act 2002	2002 (No. 115)	Yes (as made)	
Eggs (Export Inspection Charge) Act 1982	1982 (No. 14)	No	
Eggs (Export Inspection Charge) Collection Act 1982	1982 (No. 15)	No	
Election Expenses Reimbursement Act 1908	1908 (No. 20)	No	
Electoral and Referendum Amendment (Electoral Integrity and Other Measures) Act 2006	2006 (No. 65)	Yes (as amended)	
Electoral Divisions Act 1903	1903 (No. 9)	No	
Electoral Validating Act 1906	1906 (No. 12)	No	
Electronic Transactions Act 1999	1999 (No. 162)	Yes (as amended)	
Emergency Legislation Suspension Act 1932	1932 (No. 13)	No	
Emergency Response Fund Act 2019	2019 (No. 90)	Yes (as made)	
Emigration Act 1910	1910 (No. 26)	No	
Empire Air Service (England to Australia) Act 1938	1938 (No. 13)	No	
Empire Air Service (England to Australia) Act 1941	1941 (No. 11)	No	
Employment, Education and Training Act 1988	1988 (No. 80)	No	
Employment Services Act 1994	1994 (No. 176)	No	
Endangered Species Protection Act 1992	1992 (No. 194)	No	
Enemy Contracts Annulment Act 1915	1915 (No. 11)	No	
Energy Efficiency Opportunities Act 2006	2006 (No. 31)	No	
Energy Grants (Cleaner Fuels) Scheme Act 2004	2004 (No. 41)	No	
Energy Grants (Credits) Scheme Act 2003	2003 (No. 53)	No	
Enhancing Online Safety for Children Act 2015	2015 (No. 24)	Yes (as amended)	
Enhancing Online Safety for Children (Consequential Amendments) Act 2015	2015 (No. 25)	Yes (as made)	
Entertainments Tax Act 1916	1916 (No. 38)	No	
Entertainments Tax Act 1942	1942 (No. 42)	No	
Entertainments Tax Assessment Act 1916	1916 (No. 36)	No	
Entertainments Tax Assessment Act 1942	1942 (No. 41)	No	
Environment (Financial Assistance) Act 1977	1977 (No. 150)	No	
Environment Protection (Alligator Rivers Region) Act 1978	1978 (No. 28)	Yes (as amended)	
Environment Protection and Biodiversity Conservation Act 1999	1999 (No. 91)	Yes (as amended)	
Environment Protection and Biodiversity Conservation Amendment (Wildlife Protection) Act 2001	2001 (No. 82)	Yes (as made)	
Environment Protection (Impact of Proposals) Act 1974	1974 (No. 164)	No	
Environment Protection (Northern Territory Supreme Court) Act 1978	1978 (No. 30)	Yes (as amended)	
Environment Protection (Nuclear Codes) Act 1978	1978 (No. 32)	No	
Environment Protection (Sea Dumping) Act 1981	1981 (No. 101)	Yes (as amended)	
Environmental Reform (Consequential Provisions) Act 1999	1999 (No. 92)	Yes (as made)	
Epidemiological Studies (Confidentiality) Act 1981	1981 (No. 148)	Yes (as amended)	
Equal Employment Opportunity (Commonwealth Authorities) Act 1987	1987 (No. 20)	Yes (as amended)	
Estate Duty Act 1914	1914 (No. 25)	No	
Estate Duty Assessment Act 1914	1914 (No. 22)	No	
Estate Duty Convention (United States of America) Act 1953	1953 (No. 83)	No	
European Bank for Reconstruction and Development Act 1990	1990 (No. 129)	Yes (as amended)	
Evidence Act 1905	1905 (No. 4)	Yes (as made)	
Evidence Act 1995	1905 (No. 2)	Yes (as amended)	
Evidence and Procedure (New Zealand) Act 1994	1994 (No. 111)	No	
Excess Exploration Credit Tax Act 2015	2015 (No. 17)	Yes (as made)	
Excise Act 1901	1901 (No. 9)	Yes (as amended)	
Excise Amendment (Compliance Improvement) Act 2000	2000 (No. 115)	Yes (as made)	
Excise Procedure Act 1907	1908 (No. 1)	No	
Excise Tariff Rebate Act 1944	1944 (No. 21)	No	
Exotic Animal Disease Control Act 1989	1989 (No. 130)	No	
Explosives Act 1952	1952 (No. 99)	No	
Explosives Act 1961	1961 (No. 65)	Yes (as amended)	
Export Charges (Collection) Act 2015	2015 (No. 92)	Yes (as amended)	List of Acts of the Parliament of Australia
Export Charges (Imposition—Customs) Act 2015	2015 (No. 93)	Yes (as made)	
Export Charges (Imposition—Excise) Act 2015	2015 (No. 94)	Yes (as made)	
Export Charges (Imposition—General) Act 2015	2015 (No. 95)	Yes (as made)	
Export Control Act 1982	1982 (No. 47)	Yes (as amended)	
Export Control Act 2020	2020 (No. 12)	Yes (as made)	
Export Control (Miscellaneous Amendments) Act 1982	1982 (No. 48)	No	
Export Expansion Grants Act 1978	1978 (No. 162)	No	
Export Finance and Insurance Corporation Act 1974	1974 (No. 122)	No	
Export Finance and Insurance Corporation Act 1991	1991 (No. 148)	Yes (as amended)	
Export Finance and Insurance Corporation Amendment Act 2007	2007 (No. 6)	Yes (as made)	
Export Finance and Insurance Corporation (Transitional Provisions and Consequential Amendments) Act 1991	1991 (No. 149)	Yes (as made)	
Export Guarantee Act 1924	1924 (No. 42)	No	
Export Incentive Grants Act 1971	1971 (No. 110)	No	
Export Inspection Charge Act 1985	1985 (No. 26)	Yes (as amended)	
Export Inspection Charge Collection Act 1985	1985 (No. 27)	Yes (as amended)	
Export Inspection (Establishment Registration Charge) Act 1985	1985 (No. 117)	Yes (as amended)	
Export Inspection (Service Charge) Act 1985	1985 (No. 116)	Yes (as amended)	
Export Market Development Grants Act 1974	1974 (No. 154)	No	
Export Market Development Grants Act 1997	1997 (No. 57)	Yes (as amended)	
Export Market Development Grants (Repeal and Consequential Provisions) Act 1997	1997 (No. 44)	Yes (as amended)	
Export Payments Insurance Corporation Act 1956	1956 (No. 32)	No	
Export Payments Insurance Corporation Act (No. 2) 1959	1959 (No. 101)	No	
Extension of Charitable Purpose Act 2004	2004 (No. 107)	No	
Extradition Act 1903	1903 (No 12)	No	
Extradition Act 1988	1988 (No. 4)	Yes (as amended)	
Extradition (Commonwealth Countries) Act 1966	1966 (No. 75)	No	
Extradition (Foreign States) Act 1966	1966 (No. 76)	No	
Extradition (Repeal and Consequential Provisions) Act 1988	1988 (No. 5)	No	
Fair Entitlements Guarantee Act 2012	2012 (No. 159)	Yes (as amended)	
Fair Work Act 2009	2009 (No. 28)	Yes (as amended)	
Fair Work (Transitional Provisions and Consequential Amendments) Act 2009	2009 (No. 55)	Yes (as amended)	
Families, Community Services and Indigenous Affairs and Other Legislation (2006 Budget and Other Measures) Act 2006	2006 (No. 82)	Yes (as made)	
Families, Community Services and Indigenous Affairs and Veterans' Affairs Legislation Amendment (2006 Budget Measures) Act 2006	2006 (No. 156)	Yes (as made)	
Families, Housing, Community Services and Indigenous Affairs and Other Legislation Amendment (Further 2008 Budget and Other Measures) Act 2008	2008 (No. 143)	Yes (as made)	
Family Assistance and Other Legislation Amendment (Schoolkids Bonus Budget Measures) Act 2012	2012 (No. 50)	Yes (as amended)	
Family Assistance Legislation Amendment (More Help for Families—One-off Payments) Act 2004	2004 (No. 60)	Yes (as amended)	
Family Court of Western Australia (Orders of Registrars) Act 1997	1997 (No. 148)	Yes (as made)	
Family Law Act 1975	1975 (No. 53)	Yes (as amended)	
Family Law Amendment (Validation of Certain Orders and Other Measures) Act 2012	2012 (No. 32)	Yes (as amended)	
Family Law Amendment (Validation of Certain Parenting Orders and Other Measures) Act 2010	2010 (No. 147)	Yes (as amended)	
Family Law (Divorce Fees Validation) Act 2007	2007 (No. 23)	Yes (as made)	
Family Trust Distribution Tax (Primary Liability) Act 1998	1998 (No. 10)	Yes (as amended)	
Family Trust Distribution Tax (Secondary Liability) Act 1998	1998 (No. 11)	Yes (as amended)	
Farm Household Support Act 1992	1992 (No. 241)	No	
Farm Household Support Act 2014	2014 (No. 12)	Yes (as amended)	
Farm Household Support (Consequential and Transitional Provisions) Act 2014	2014 (No. 13)	Yes (as amended)	
Federal Aid Roads Act 1926	1926 (No. 46)	No	
Federal Aid Roads Act 1931	1931 (No. 22)	No	
Federal Aid Roads Act 1936	1936 (No. 63)	No	
Federal Aid Roads and Works Act 1937	1937 (No. 3)	No	
Federal Airports Corporation Act 1986	1986 (No. 4)	No	
Federal Circuit Court of Australia Legislation Amendment Act 2012	2012 (No. 165)	Yes (as amended)	
Federal Court of Australia Act 1976	1976 (No. 156)	Yes (as amended)	
Federal Financial Relations Act 2009	2009 (No. 11)	Yes (as amended)	
Federal Magistrates Act 1999	1999 (No. 193)	Yes (as amended)	
Federal Proceedings (Costs) Act 1981	1981 (No. 23)	Yes (as amended)	
Film and Television School Act 1973	1973 (No. 95)	Yes (as amended)	
Film Licensed Investment Company Act 1998	1998 (No. 107)	No	
Film Licensed Investment Company Act 2005	2005 (No. 57)	No	
Financial Agreement Act 1928	1928 (No. 5)	No	
Financial Agreement Act 1944	1944 (No. 46)	No	
Financial Agreement Act 1976	1976 (No. 24)	No	
Financial Agreement Act 1994	1994 (No. 106)	Yes (as amended)	
Financial Agreement Validation Act 1929	1929 (No. 4)	Yes (as made)	
Financial Agreements (Commonwealth Liability) Act 1932	1932 (No. 2)	Yes (as amended)	
Financial Agreements Enforcement Act 1932	1932 (No. 3)	No	
Financial Claims Scheme (ADIs) Levy Act 2008	2008 (No. 103)	Yes (as made)	
Financial Claims Scheme (General Insurers) Levy Act 2008	2008 (No. 104)	Yes (as made)	
Financial Corporations Act 1974	1974 (No. 36)	No	
Financial Corporations (Transfer of Assets and Liabilities) Act 1993	1993 (No. 97)	Yes (as amended)	
Financial Emergency Act 1931	1931 (No. 10)	No	
Financial Emergency (State Legislation) Act 1932	1932 (No. 11)	No	
Financial Framework Legislation Amendment Act (No. 2) 2012	2012 (No. 82)	Yes (as made)	
Financial Institutions Supervisory Levies Collection Act 1998	1998 (No. 53)	Yes (as amended)	
Financial Management and Accountability Act 1997	1997 (No. 154)	Yes (as amended)	
Financial Relief Act 1932	1932 (No. 64)	No	
Financial Relief Act 1934	1934 (No. 16)	No	
Financial Sector (Collection of Data) Act 2001	2001 (No. 104)	Yes (as amended)	
Financial Sector (Collection of Data—Consequential and Transitional Provisions) Act 2001	2001 (No. 121)	Yes (as amended)	
Financial Sector Reform (Amendments and Transitional Provisions) Act 1998	1998 (No. 54)	Yes (as amended)	
Financial Sector Reform (Amendments and Transitional Provisions) Act (No. 1) 1999	1999 (No. 44)	Yes (as amended)	
Financial Sector Reform (Amendments and Transitional Provisions) Act (No. 1) 2000	2000 (No. 24)	Yes (as made)	
Financial Sector (Shareholdings) Act 1998	1998 (No. 55)	Yes (as amended)	
Financial Sector (Transfers of Business) Act 1999	1999 (No. 45)	Yes (as amended)	
First Home Owners Act 1983	1983 (No. 46)	No	
First Home Saver Account Providers Supervisory Levy Imposition Act 2008	2008 (No. 93)	No	
First Home Saver Accounts Act 2008	2008 (No. 44)	No	
First Home Super Saver Tax Act 2017	2017 (No. 133)	Yes (as made)	
Fish (Export Inspection Charge) Act 1981	1981 (No. 57)	No	
Fish (Export Inspection Charge) Collection Act 1981	1981 (No. 58)	No	
Fisheries Act 1952	1952 (No. 7)	No	
Fisheries Administration Act 1991	1991 (No. 161)	Yes (as amended)	
Fisheries Agreements (Payments) Act 1981	1981 (No. 180)	No	
Fisheries Agreements (Payments) Act 1991	1991 (No. 151)	Yes (as made)	
Fisheries Legislation Amendment (New Governance Arrangements for the Australian Fisheries Management Authority and Other Matters) Act 2008	2008 (No. 36)	Yes (as made)	
Fisheries Legislation (Consequential Provisions) Act 1991	1991 (No. 163)	Yes (as amended)	
Fisheries Licences Levy Act 1984	1984 (No. 151)	Yes (as amended)	
Fisheries Management Act 1991	1991 (No. 162)	Yes (as amended)	
Fisheries (Validation of Plans of Management) Act 2004	2004 (No. 158)	Yes (as made)	
Fishing Industry Act 1956	1956 (No. 22)	No	
Fishing Industry Research Act 1969	1969 (No. 80)	No	
Fishing Industry Research and Development Act 1987	1987 (No. 174)	No	
Fishing Levy Act 1991	1991 (No. 156)	Yes (as amended)	
Flags Act 1953	1954 (No. 1)	Yes (as amended)	
Flax and Linseed Bounties Act 1930	1930 (No. 45)	No	
Flax Canvas Bounty Act 1950	1950 (No. 54)	No	
Flax Fibre Bounty Act 1954	1954 (No. 68)	No	
Flax Industry Act 1953	1953 (No. 25)	No	
Flax Industry Act Repeal Act 1960	1960 (No. 5)	No	
Flour Tax Act 1938	1938 (No. 49)	No	
Flour Tax Act (No. 1) 1933	1933 (No. 44)	No	
Flour Tax Act (No. 1) 1934	1934 (No. 56)	No	
Flour Tax Act (No. 2) 1933	1933 (No. 45)	No	
Flour Tax Act (No. 2) 1934	1934 (No. 57)	No	
Flour Tax Act (No. 3) 1933	1933 (No. 46)	No	
Flour Tax Act (No. 3) 1934	1934 (No. 58)	No	
Flour Tax Assessment Act 1933	1933 (No. 43)	No	
Flour Tax Assessment Act (No. 2) 1934	1934 (No. 55)	No	
Flour Tax (Imports and Exports) Act 1938	1938 (No. 51)	No	
Flour Tax (Stocks) Act 1938	1938 (No. 50)	No	
Flour Tax (Wheat Industry Assistance) Assessment Act 1938	1938 (No. 48)	No	
Foot and Mouth Disease Act 1961	1961 (No. 44)	No	
Foreign Acquisitions and Takeovers Fees Imposition Act 2015	2015 (No. 152)	Yes (as amended)	
Foreign Antitrust Judgments (Restriction of Enforcement) Act 1979	1979 (No. 13)	No	
Foreign Corporations (Application of Laws) Act 1989	1989 (No. 183)	Yes (as amended)	
Foreign Evidence Act 1994	1994 (No. 59)	Yes (as amended)	
Foreign Evidence (Transitional Provisions and Consequential Amendments) Act 1994	1994 (No. 43)	Yes (as made)	
Foreign Fishing Boats Levy Act 1981	1981 (No. 179)	No	
Foreign Fishing Licences Levy Act 1991	1991 (No. 150)	Yes (as made)	
Foreign Influence Transparency Scheme Act 2018	2018 (No. 63)	Yes (as amended)	
Foreign Judgments Act 1991	1991 (No. 112)	Yes (as amended)	
Foreign Proceedings (Excess of Jurisdiction) Act 1984	1984 (No. 3)	Yes (as amended)	
Foreign Proceedings (Prohibition of Certain Evidence) Act 1976	1976 (No. 121)	No	
Foreign States Immunities Act 1985	1985 (No. 196)	Yes (as amended)	
Foreign Takeovers Act 1975	1975 (No. 92)	Yes (as amended)	
Forest Industries Research Export Charge Act 1993	1993 (No. 89)	No	
Forest Industries Research Import Charge Act 1993	1993 (No. 90)	No	
Forest Industries Research Levy Act 1993	1993 (No. 91)	No	
Forestry Bureau Act 1930	1930 (No. 16)	No	
Forestry Marketing and Research and Development Services Act 2007	2007 (No. 122)	Yes (as amended)	
Forestry Marketing and Research and Development Services (Transitional and Consequential Provisions) Act 2007	2007 (No. 123)	No	
Franchise Fees Windfall Tax (Collection) Act 1997	1997 (No. 132)	Yes (as amended)	
Franchise Fees Windfall Tax (Imposition) Act 1997	1997 (No. 133)	Yes (as made)	
Freedom of Information Act 1982	1982 (No. 3)	Yes (as amended)	
Freedom of Information Amendment (Reform) Act 2010	2010 (No. 51)	Yes (as amended)	
Freight Arrangements Act 1915	1915 (No. 40)	No	
Fresh Fruits Export Charges Act 1927	1927 (No. 23)	No	
Fresh Fruits Overseas Marketing Act 1927	1927 (No. 22)	No	
Fringe Benefits Tax Act 1986	1986 (No. 40)	Yes (as amended)	
Fringe Benefits Tax (Application to the Commonwealth) Act 1986	1986 (No. 42)	Yes (as amended)	
Fringe Benefits Tax Assessment Act 1986	1986 (No. 39)	Yes (as amended)	
Fringe Benefits Tax (Miscellaneous Provisions) Act 1986	1986 (No. 41)	No	
Fruit Growers' Relief Act 1933	1933 (No. 39)	No	
Fuel Blending (Penalty Surcharge) Act 1997	1997 (No. 165)	No	
Fuel Indexation (Road Funding) Special Account Act 2015	2015 (No. 103)	Yes (as amended)	
Fuel Misuse (Penalty Surcharge) Act 1997	1997 (No. 163)	No	
Fuel (Penalty Surcharges) Administration Act 1997	1997 (No. 166)	No	
Fuel Quality Standards Act 2000	2000 (No. 153)	Yes (as amended)	
Fuel Sale (Penalty Surcharge) Act 1997	1997 (No. 164)	No	
Fuel Sales Grants Act 2000	2000 (No. 59)	No	
Fuel Tax Act 2006	2006 (No. 72)	Yes (as amended)	
Fuel Tax (Consequential and Transitional Provisions) Act 2006	2006 (No. 73)	Yes (as amended)	
Funding Arrangements Act 1921	1921 (No. 15)	No	
Future Drought Fund Act 2019	2019 (No. 55)	Yes (as amended)	
Future Fund Act 2006	2006 (No. 12)	Yes (as amended)	
Futures Industry Act 1986	1986 (No. 72)	No	
Futures Industry (Fees) Act 1986	1986 (No. 73)	No	
Futures Industry (Fees: Taxation Component) Act 1989	1989 (No. 104)	No	
Futures Organisations (Application For Membership) Fidelity Funds Contribution Act 1989	1989 (No. 117)	No	
Futures Organisations Fidelity Funds Levy Act 1989	1989 (No. 119)	No	
Futures Organisations (Membership) Fidelity Funds Contribution Act 1989	1989 (No. 118)	No	
G20 (Safety and Security) Complementary Act 2014	2014 (No. 92)	No	
Gas Pipelines Access (Commonwealth) Act 1998	1998 (No. 101)	No	
Gene Technology Act 2000	2000 (No. 169)	Yes (as amended)	
Gene Technology (Licence Charges) Act 2000	2000 (No. 171)	Yes (as made)	
General Insurance Supervisory Levy Act 1989	1989 (No. 17)	No	
General Insurance Supervisory Levy Determination Validation Act 2000	2000 (No. 15)	No	
General Insurance Supervisory Levy Imposition Act 1998	1998 (No. 56)	Yes (as amended)	
General Interest Charge (Imposition) Act 1999	1999 (No. 6)	Yes (as amended)	
Geneva Convention Act 1938	1938 (No. 14)	No	
Geneva Conventions Act 1957	1957 (No. 103)	Yes (as amended)	
Genocide Convention Act 1949	1949 (No. 27)	Yes (as made)	
Geophysical Survey Act 1928	1928 (No. 24)	No	
Gift Duty Act 1941	1941 (No. 53)	No	
Gift Duty Assessment Act 1941	1941 (No. 52)	No	
Gift Duty Convention (United States of America) Act 1953	1953 (No. 84)	No	
Gladstone Power Station Agreement Act 1970	1970 (No. 28)	No	
Glebe Lands (Appropriation) Act 1974	1974 (No. 35)	No	
Goat Fibre Levy Act 1989	1989 (No. 138)	No	
Goat Fibre Levy Collection Act 1989	1989 (No. 143)	No	
Gold Bounty Act 1930	1930 (No. 75)	No	
Gold Mines Development Assistance Act 1962	1962 (No. 102)	No	
Gold Mining Encouragement Act 1940	1940 (No. 38)	No	
Gold Tax Act 1939	1939 (No. 52)	No	
Gold Tax Collection Act 1939	1939 (No. 51)	No	
Gold Tax Suspension Act 1947	1947 (No. 58)	No	
Gold-Mining Industry Assistance Act 1954	1954 (No. 79)	No	
Governance of Australian Government Superannuation Schemes Act 2011	2011 (No. 59)	Yes (as amended)	
Governance Review Implementation (AASB and AUASB) Act 2008	2008 (No. 61)	Yes (as made)	
Governance Review Implementation (Treasury Portfolio Agencies) Act 2007	2007 (No. 74)	Yes (as made)	
Government Procurement (Judicial Review) Act 2018	2018 (No. 129)	Yes (as made)	
Governor-General Act 1974	1974 (No. 16)	Yes (as amended)	
Governor-General's Establishment Act 1902	1902 (No. 7)	No	
Governor-General's Residences Act 1906	1906 (No. 2)	No	
Grafton to South Brisbane Railway Act 1924	1924 (No. 54)	No	
Grain (Export Inspection Charge) Act 1979	1979 (No. 47)	No	
Grain (Export Inspection Charge) Collection Act 1979	1979 (No. 48)	No	
Grain Legumes Levy Act 1985	1985 (No. 106)	No	
Grain Legumes Levy Collection Act 1985	1985 (No. 107)	No	
Grants Commission Act 1973	1973 (No. 54)	Yes (as amended)	
Grape and Wine Legislation Amendment (Australian Grape and Wine Authority) Act 2013	2013 (No. 136)	Yes (as amended)	
Grape Research Levy Act 1986	1986 (No. 63)	No	
Grape Research Levy Collection Act 1986	1986 (No. 64)	No	
Great Barrier Reef Marine Park Act 1975	1975 (No. 85)	Yes (as amended)	
Great Barrier Reef Marine Park (Environmental Management Charge—Excise) Act 1993	1993 (No. 14)	Yes (as amended)	
Great Barrier Reef Marine Park (Environmental Management Charge—General) Act 1993	1993 (No. 15)	Yes (as amended)	
Greenhouse and Energy Minimum Standards Act 2012	2012 (No. 132)	Yes (as amended)	
Greenhouse and Energy Minimum Standards (Registration Fees) Act 2012	2012 (No. 133)	Yes (as made)	
Growth Centres (Financial Assistance) Act 1973	1973 (No. 191)	No	
Guarantee of Lending to Small and Medium Enterprises (Coronavirus Economic Response Package) Act 2020	2020 (No. 29)	Yes (as made)	
Handicapped Children (Assistance) Act 1970	1970 (No. 27)	No	
Handicapped Children (Assistance) Act 1973	1973 (No. 137)	No	
Handicapped Persons Assistance Act 1974	1974 (No. 134)	No	
Hazardous Waste (Regulation of Exports and Imports) Act 1989	1990 (No. 6)	Yes (as amended)	
Hazardous Waste (Regulation of Exports and Imports) Levy Act 2017	2017 (No. 9)	Yes (as made)	
Health and Other Services (Compensation) Act 1995	1995 (No. 130)	Yes (as amended)	
Health and Other Services (Compensation) Care Charges Act 1995	1995 (No. 131)	Yes (as amended)	
Health Insurance Act 1973	1974 (No. 42)	Yes (as amended)	
Health Insurance Amendment (Extended Medicare Safety Net) Act 2012	2012 (No. 123)	Yes (as made)	
Health Insurance Amendment (Professional Services Review) Act 2012	2012 (No. 76)	Yes (as made)	
Health Insurance (Approved Pathology Specimen Collection Centres) Tax Act 2000	2000 (No. 134)	Yes (as amended)	
Health Insurance Commission Act 1973	1974 (No. 41)	Yes (as amended)	
Health Insurance Commission (Reform and Separation of Functions) Act 1997	1997 (No. 159)	Yes (as amended)	
Health Insurance Levy Act 1976	1976 (No. 54)	No	
Health Insurance Levy Act 1977	1977 (No. 132)	No	
Health Insurance Levy Act 1978	1978 (No. 127)	No	
Health Insurance Levy Act (No. 2) 1976	1976 (No. 97)	No	
Health Insurance (Pathology) (Fees) Act 1991	1991 (No. 191)	Yes (as amended)	
Health Insurance (Pathology) (Licence Fee) Act 1991	1991 (No. 192)	No	
Health Workforce Australia (Abolition) Act 2014	2014 (No. 103)	Yes (as made)	
Health Workforce Australia Act 2009	2009 (No. 72)	No	
Healthcare Identifiers Act 2010	2010 (No. 72)	Yes (as amended)	
Heard Island and McDonald Islands Act 1953	1953 (No. 7)	Yes (as amended)	
Hearing Services Act 1991	1991 (No. 169)	Yes (as amended)	
Hearing Services Administration Act 1997	1997 (No. 81)	Yes (as amended)	
Hearing Services and AGHS Reform Act 1997	1997 (No. 82)	Yes (as amended)	
Hide and Leather Industries Act 1948	1948 (No. 71)	No	
Hide and Leather Industries Legislation Repeal Act 1955	1955 (No. 13)	No	
High Commissioner Act 1909	1909 (No. 22)	No	
High Court Justices (Long Leave Payments) Act 1979	1979 (No. 89)	Yes (as amended)	
High Court of Australia Act 1979	1979 (No. 137)	Yes (as amended)	
High Court Procedure Act 1903	1903 (No. 7)	No	
Higher Education Endowment Fund Act 2007	2007 (No. 160)	No	
Higher Education Funding Act 1988	1989 (No. 2)	Yes (as amended)	
Higher Education Support Act 2003	2003 (No. 149)	Yes (as amended)	
Higher Education Support (Charges) Act 2019	2019 (No. 85)	Yes (as made)	
Higher Education Support (HELP Tuition Protection Levy) Act 2020	2020 (No. 4)	Yes (as made)	
Higher Education Support (Transitional Provisions and Consequential Amendments) Act 2003	2003 (No. 150)	Yes (as amended)	
HIH Royal Commission (Transfer of Records) Act 2003	2003 (No. 61)	Yes (as made)	
Hindmarsh Island Bridge Act 1997	1997 (No. 60)	Yes (as made)	
Historic Shipwrecks Act 1976	1976 (No. 190)	No	
Home and Community Care Act 1985	1985 (No. 184)	Yes (as amended)	
Home Deposit Assistance Act 1982	1982 (No. 40)	No	
Home Nursing Subsidy Act 1956	1956 (No. 84)	No	
Homeless Persons Assistance Act 1974	1974 (No. 148)	No	
Homes Savings Grant Act 1964	1964 (No. 51)	No	
Homes Savings Grant Act 1976	1976 (No. 183)	No	
Honey Export Charge Act 1973	1973 (No. 183)	No	
Honey Export Charge Collection Act 1973	1973 (No. 184)	No	
Honey Industry Act 1962	1962 (No. 105)	No	
Honey Legislation (Repeal and Amendment) Act 1992	1992 (No. 122)	No	
Honey Levy Act (No. 1) 1962	1962 (No. 106)	No	
Honey Levy Act (No. 2) 1962	1962 (No. 107)	No	
Honey Levy Collection Act 1962	1962 (No. 108)	No	
Honey Marketing Act 1988	1988 (No. 33)	No	
Honey Research Act 1980	1980 (No. 144)	No	
Hop Pool Agreement Act 1924	1924 (No. 9)	No	
Horse Disease Response Levy Act 2011	2011 (No 115)	Yes (as made)	
Horse Disease Response Levy Collection Act 2011	2011 (No. 116)	Yes (as amended)	
Horticultural Export Charge Act 1987	1987 (No. 170)	No	
Horticultural Export Charge Collection Act 1987	1987 (No. 171)	No	
Horticultural Levy Act 1987	1987 (No. 168)	No	
Horticultural Levy Collection Act 1987	1987 (No. 169)	No	
Horticultural Policy Council Act 1987	1987 (No. 167)	No	
Horticultural Research and Development Corporation Act 1987	1987 (No. 166)	No	
Horticulture Marketing and Research and Development Services Act 2000	2000 (No. 162)	Yes (as amended)	
Horticulture Marketing and Research and Development Services (Repeals and Consequential Provisions) Act 2000	2000 (No. 163)	Yes (as amended)	
Hospital Benefits Act 1945	1945 (No. 47)	No	
Hospital Benefits Act 1951	1951 (No. 75)	No	
Hospitals and Health Services Commission Act 1973	1973 (No. 211)	No	
Hospitals and Health Services Commission (Repeal) Act 1978	1978 (No. 91)	No	
House of Representatives (Quorum) Act 1989	1989 (No. 42)	Yes (as made)	
Household Stimulus Package Act (No. 2) 2009	2009 (No. 4)	Yes (as made)	
Housing Agreement Act 1956	1956 (No. 43)	No	
Housing Agreement Act 1961	1961 (No. 31)	No	
Housing Agreement Act 1966	1966 (No. 24)	No	
Housing Agreement Act 1973	1973 (No. 43)	No	
Housing Agreement Act 1974	1974 (No. 102)	No	
Housing Assistance Act 1973	1973 (No. 30)	No	
Housing Assistance Act 1978	1978 (No. 79)	No	
Housing Assistance Act 1981	1981 (No. 70)	No	
Housing Assistance Act 1984	1984 (No. 138)	No	
Housing Assistance Act 1989	1990 (No. 7)	No	
Housing Assistance Act 1996	1996 (No. 24)	No	
Housing Loans Guarantees (Australian Capital Territory) Act 1959	1959 (No. 46)	Yes (as made)	
Housing Loans Guarantees (Northern Territory) Act 1959	1959 (No. 47)	Yes (as made)	
Housing Loans Insurance Act 1965	1965 (No. 10)	No	
Housing Loans Insurance Corporation (Sale of Assets and Abolition) Act 1990	1991 (No. 16)	No	
Housing Loans Insurance Corporation (Transfer of Assets and Abolition) Act 1996	1996 (No. 14)	No	
Housing Loans Insurance Corporation (Transfer of Pre-transfer Contracts) Act 2006	2006 (No. 141)	No	
Human Rights and Equal Opportunity Commission Act 1986	1986 (No. 125)	Yes (as amended)	
Human Rights and Equal Opportunity Commission (Transitional Provisions and Consequential Amendments) Act 1986	1986 (No. 126)	Yes (as made)	
Human Rights Commission Act 1981	1981 (No. 24)	No	
Human Rights Legislation Amendment Act (No. 1) 1999	1999 (No. 133)	No	
Human Rights (Parliamentary Scrutiny) Act 2011	2011 (No. 186)	Yes (as amended)	
Human Rights (Sexual Conduct) Act 1994	1994 (No. 179)	Yes (as amended)	
Illegal Logging Prohibition Act 2012	2012 (No. 166)	Yes (as amended)	
Immigration (Education) Act 1971	1971 (No. 3)	Yes (as amended)	
Immigration (Education) Charge Act 1992	1992 (No. 177)	No	
Immigration (Guardianship of Children) Act 1946	1946 (No. 45)	Yes (as amended)	
Immigration Loan Act 1922	1922 (No. 31)	No	
Immigration Restriction Act 1901	1901 (No. 17)	No	
Immigration (Unauthorized Arrivals) Act 1980	1980 (No. 112)	No	
Import Processing Charges Act 1997	1997 (No. 2)	No	
Import Processing Charges Act 2001	2001 (No. 90)	Yes (as amended)	
Import Processing Charges (Amendment and Repeal) Act 2002	2002 (No. 79)	No	
Imported Food Charges (Collection) Act 2015	2015 (No. 96)	Yes (as amended)	
Imported Food Charges (Imposition—Customs) Act 2015	2015 (No. 97)	Yes (as amended)	
Imported Food Charges (Imposition—Excise) Act 2015	2015 (No. 98)	Yes (as amended)	
Imported Food Charges (Imposition—General) Act 2015	2015 (No. 99)	Yes (as amended)	
Imported Food Control Act 1992	1992 (No. 221)	Yes (as amended)	
Income Equalization Deposits (Interest Adjustment) Act 1984	1984 (No. 175)	No	
Income Tax and Social Services Contribution Assessment (Air Navigation Charges) Act 1952	1952 (No. 103)	No	
Income Tax (Arrangements with the States) Act 1978	1978 (No. 87)	No	
Income Tax Assessment Act 1915	1915 (No. 34)	No	
Income Tax Assessment Act 1922	1922 (No. 37)	No	
Income Tax Assessment Act 1936	1936 (No. 27)	Yes (as amended)	
Income Tax Assessment Act 1997	1997 (No. 38)	Yes (as amended)	
Income Tax Assessment (Bonus Shares) Act 1926	1926 (No. 12)	No	
Income Tax Assessment (Live Stock) Act 1924	1924 (No. 33)	No	
Income Tax Collection Act 1923	1923 (No. 28)	No	
Income Tax Rates Act 1986	1986 (No. 107)	Yes (as amended)	
Income Tax (Salaries) Assessment Act 1930	1930 (No. 58)	No	
Independent Air Fares Committee Act 1981	1981 (No. 76)	No	
Independent Contractors Act 2006	2006 (No. 162)	Yes (as amended)	
Independent National Security Legislation Monitor Act 2010	2010 (No. 32)	Yes (as amended)	
Independent Parliamentary Expenses Authority Act 2017	2017 (No. 2)	Yes (as amended)	
Independent Schools (Loans Guarantee) Act 1969	1969 (No. 23)	No	
Indigenous Education (Targeted Assistance) Act 2000	2000 (No. 147)	Yes (as amended)	
Indus Basin Development Fund Agreement Act 1960	1960 (No. 87)	No	
Indus Basin Development Fund Supplemental Agreement Act 1965	1965 (No. 2)	No	
Industrial Chemicals Act 2019	2019 (No. 12)	Yes (as made)	
Industrial Chemicals Charges (Customs) Act 2019	2019 (No. 18)	Yes (as made)	
Industrial Chemicals Charges (Excise) Act 2019	2019 (No. 19)	Yes (as made)	
Industrial Chemicals Charges (General) Act 2019	2019 (No. 20)	Yes (as made)	
Industrial Chemicals (Consequential Amendments and Transitional Provisions) Act 2019	2019 (No. 13)	Yes (as made)	
Industrial Chemicals (Notification and Assessment) Act 1989	1990 (No. 8)	Yes (as amended)	
Industrial Chemicals (Registration Charge—Customs) Act 1997	1997 (No. 100)	Yes (as made)	
Industrial Chemicals (Registration Charge—Excise) Act 1997	1997 (No. 101)	Yes (as made)	
Industrial Chemicals (Registration Charge—General) Act 1997	1997 (No. 102)	Yes (as made)	
Industrial Peace Act 1920	1920 (No. 21)	No	
Industrial Relations Act 1988	1988 (No. 86)	Yes (as amended)	
Industrial Relations (Consequential Provisions) Act 1988	1988 (No. 87)	Yes (as amended)	
Industrial Research and Development Grants Act 1967	1967 (No. 51)	No	
Industrial Research and Development Incentives Act 1976	1976 (No. 85)	No	
Industries Assistance Commission Act 1973	1973 (No. 169)	No	
Industry Commission Act 1989	1990 (No. 9)	No	
Industry Research and Development Act 1986	1986 (No. 89)	Yes (as amended)	
Industry, Technology And Commerce Legislation Amendment Act (No. 2) 1989	1990 (No. 10)	No	
Infrastructure Australia Act 2008	2008 (No. 17)	Yes (as amended)	
Infrastructure Australia Amendment Act 2014	2014 (No. 77)	Yes (as made)	
Infrastructure Certificate Cancellation Tax Act 1994	1994 (No. 160)	No	
Insolvency Law Reform Act 2016	2016 (No. 11)	Yes (as made)	
Inspector of Transport Security Act 2006	2006 (No. 149)	Yes (as amended)	
Inspector-General of Intelligence and Security Act 1986	1986 (No. 101)	Yes (as amended)	
Inspector-General of Live Animal Exports Act 2019	2019 (No. 81)	Yes (as made)	
Inspector-General of Taxation Act 2003	2003 (No. 28)	Yes (as amended)	
Institute of Science and Industry Act 1920	1920 (No. 22)	No	
Insurance Acquisitions and Takeovers Act 1991	1992 (No. 6)	Yes (as amended)	
Insurance Act 1932	1932 (No. 4)	No	
Insurance Act 1973	1973 (No. 76)	Yes (as amended)	
Insurance (Agents and Brokers) Act 1984	1984 (No. 75)	No	
Insurance and Superannuation Commissioner Act 1987	1987 (No. 98)	No	
Insurance Contracts Act 1984	1984 (No. 80)	Yes (as amended)	
Insurance Supervisory Levies Collection Act 1989	1989 (No. 18)	No	
Intelligence Services Act 2001	2001 (No. 152)	Yes (as amended)	
Interactive Gambling Act 2001	2001 (No. 84)	Yes (as amended)	
Interactive Gambling (Moratorium) Act 2000	2000 (No. 151)	No	
Interim Forces Benefits Act 1947	1947 (No. 46)	No	
International Air Services Commission Act 1992	1992 (No. 103)	Yes (as amended)	
International Bank for Reconstruction and Development (General Capital Increase) Act 1989	1989 (No. 10)	Yes (as made)	
International Bank for Reconstruction and Development (Share Increase) Act 1988	1988 (No. 23)	Yes (as made)	
International Criminal Court Act 2002	2002 (No. 41)	Yes (as amended)	
International Development Association Act 1960	1960 (No. 21)	Yes (as amended)	
International Development Association Act 1987	1987 (No. 179)	No	
International Development Association (Additional Contribution) Act 1963	1963 (No. 66)	No	
International Development Association (Additional Contribution) Act 1968	1968 (No. 45)	No	
International Development Association (Further Payment) Act 1971	1971 (No. 34)	No	
International Development Association (Further Payment) Act 1974	1974 (No. 142)	No	
International Development Association (Further Payment) Act 1977	1977 (No. 86)	No	
International Development Association (Further Payment) Act 1980	1980 (No. 10)	No	
International Development Association (Further Payment) Act 1984	1984 (No. 137)	No	
International Development Association (Further Payment) Act 1990	1990 (No. 130)	No	
International Development Association (Further Payment) Act 1993	1993 (No. 3)	No	
International Development Association (Special Contribution) Act 1983	1983 (No. 88)	No	
International Development Association (Special Contribution) Act 1985	1985 (No. 11)	No	
International Finance Corporation Act 1955	1955 (No. 66)	Yes (as amended)	
International Financial Institutions (Share Increase) Act 1982	1982 (No. 7)	Yes (as made)	
International Financial Institutions (Share Increase) Act 1986	1986 (No. 143)	Yes (as made)	
International Fund for Agricultural Development Act 1977	1977 (No. 90)	Yes (as made)	
International Fund for Agricultural Development Act 1982	1982 (No. 50)	No	
International Fund for Agricultural Development Act 1987	1987 (No. 180)	No	
International Grains Arrangement Act 1967	1967 (No. 93)	No	
International Interests in Mobile Equipment (Cape Town Convention) Act 2013	2013 (No. 91)	Yes (as made)	
International Labour Organisation Act 1947	1947 (No. 91)	Yes (as made)	
International Labour Organisation Act 1973	1973 (No. 62)	Yes (as made)	
International Labour Organisation (Compliance with Conventions) Act 1992	1992 (No. 220)	Yes (as amended)	
International Monetary Agreements Act 1947	1947 (No. 5)	Yes (as amended)	
International Monetary Agreements Act 1959	1959 (No. 33)	No	
International Monetary Agreements Act 1960	1960 (No. 14)	Yes (as amended)	
International Monetary Agreements Act 1965	1965 (No. 24)	No	
International Monetary Agreements Act 1970	1970 (No. 25)	No	
International Monetary Agreements Act 1974	1974 (No. 22)	Yes (as amended)	
International Monetary Agreements (Quota Increase) Act 1980	1980 (No. 151)	Yes (as amended)	
International Monetary Fund (Quota Increase) Act 1983	1983 (No. 89)	No	
International Organisations (Privileges and Immunities) Amendment Act 2013	2013 (No. 127)	Yes (as amended)	
International Organizations (Privileges and Immunities) Act 1948	1948 (No. 72)	No	
International Organizations (Privileges and Immunities) Act 1963	1963 (No. 50)	Yes (as amended)	
International Shipping (Australian-resident Seafarers) Grants Act 1995	1995 (No. 151)	No	
International Sugar Agreement Act 1969	1969 (No. 9)	No	
International Sugar Agreement Act 1978	1978 (No. 26)	No	
International Tin Agreement Act 1971	1971 (No. 31)	No	
International Trade Organization Act 1948	1948 (No. 73)	No	
International Transfer of Prisoners Act 1997	1997 (No. 75)	Yes (as amended)	
International War Crimes Tribunals Act 1995	1995 (No. 18)	Yes (as amended)	
International Wheat Agreement Act 1948	1948 (No. 21)	No	
International Wheat Agreement Act 1949	1949 (No. 21)	No	
International Wheat Agreement Act 1953	1953 (No. 50)	No	
International Wheat Agreement Act 1956	1956 (No. 80)	No	
International Wheat Agreement Act 1959	1959 (No. 69)	No	
International Wheat Agreement Act 1962	1962 (No. 53)	No	
International Wheat Agreement Act 1971	1971 (No. 39)	No	
International Wheat Agreement (Extension) Act 1965	1965 (No. 14)	No	
International Wheat Agreement (Extension) Act 1966	1966 (No. 16)	No	
International Wheat Agreement (Extension) Act 1967	1967 (No. 94)	No	
Inter-State Commission Act 1912	1912 (No. 33)	No	
Inter-State Commission Act 1975	1975 (No. 109)	No	
Interstate Road Transport Act 1985	1985 (No. 130)	No	
Interstate Road Transport Charge Act 1985	1985 (No. 131)	No	
Invalid and Old-age Pensions Act 1908	1908 (No. 17)	No	
Invalid and Old-age Pensions (Reciprocity with New Zealand) Act 1943	1943 (No. 36)	No	
Iron and Steel Bounty Act 1918	1918 (No. 36)	No	
Iron and Steel Products Bounty Act 1922	1922 (No. 29)	No	
Iron Bounty Act 1914	1914 (No. 27)	No	
James Hardie (Investigations and Proceedings) Act 2004	2004 (No. 144)	Yes (as amended)	
Jervis Bay Territory Acceptance Act 1915	1915 (No. 19)	Yes (as amended)	
Judges (Long Leave Payments) Act 1979	1979 (No. 90)	Yes (as amended)	
Judges' Pensions Act 1948	1948 (No. 65)	No	
Judges' Pensions Act 1968	1968 (No. 151)	Yes (as amended)	
Judges' Remuneration Act 1955	1955 (No. 17)	No	
Judicial and Statutory Officers (Remuneration and Allowances) Act 1984	1984 (No. 104)	Yes (as amended)	
Judicial Appointment (Fiji) Act 1971	1971 (No. 137)	No	
Judicial Appointment (Western Samoa) Act 1980	1980 (No. 166)	No	
Judicial Misbehaviour and Incapacity (Parliamentary Commissions) Act 2012	2012 (No. 188)	Yes (as amended)	
Judiciary Act 1903	1903 (No. 6)	Yes (as amended)	
Judiciary (Diplomatic Representation) Act 1942	1942 (No. 2)	No	
Judiciary (Diplomatic Representation) Act 1977	1977 (No. 115)	No	
Julius Dam Agreement Act 1974	1974 (No. 72)	No	
Jurisdiction of Courts (Cross-vesting) Act 1987	1987 (No. 24)	Yes (as amended)	
Jurisdiction of Courts (Miscellaneous Amendments) Act 2000	2000 (No. 161)	Yes (as made)	
Jury Exemption Act 1905	1905 (No. 2)	No	
Jury Exemption Act 1965	1965 (No. 13)	Yes (as amended)	
Kalgoorlie to Port Augusta Railway Act 1911	1911 (No. 7)	No	
Kalgoorlie to Port Augusta Railway Lands Act 1918	1918 (No. 4)	No	
Kalgoorlie to Port Augusta Railway Survey Act 1907	1907 (No. 4)	No	
Kemira Tunnel (Arbitration) Act 1948	1948 (No. 55)	No	
King Island Harbour Agreement Act 1973	1973 (No. 91)	No	
King Island Shipping Service Agreement Act 1974	1974 (No. 149)	No	
Koongarra Project Area Act 1981	1981 (No. 104)	No	
Lake Eyre Basin Intergovernmental Agreement Act 2001	2001 (No. 36)	Yes (as made)	
Land Commissions (Financial Assistance) Act 1973	1973 (No. 192)	No	
Land, Mining, Shares and Shipping Act 1919	1919 (No. 27)	No	
Land Tax Abolition Act 1952	1952 (No. 81)	No	
Land Tax Act 1910	1910 (No. 21)	No	
Land Tax Assessment Act 1910	1910 (No. 22)	No	
Lands Acquisition Act 1906	1906 (No. 13)	No	
Lands Acquisition Act 1912	1912 (No. 39)	No	
Lands Acquisition Act 1955	1955 (No. 69)	No	
Lands Acquisition Act 1989	1989 (No. 15)	Yes (as amended)	
Lands Acquisition (Defence) Act 1918	1918 (No. 5)	No	
Lands Acquisition (Defence) Act 1968	1968 (No. 136)	No	
Lands Acquisition (Northern Territory Pastoral Leases) Act 1981	1981 (No. 105)	Yes (as amended)	
Lands Acquisition (Repeal and Consequential Provisions) Act 1989	1989 (No. 21)	No	
Law Courts (Sydney) Act 1977	1977 (No. 22)	Yes (as made)	
Law Enforcement (AFP Professional Standards and Related Measures) Act 2006	2006 (No. 84)	Yes (as made)	
Law Enforcement Integrity Commissioner Act 2006	2006 (No. 85)	Yes (as amended)	
Law Enforcement Integrity Commissioner (Consequential Amendments) Act 2006	2006 (No. 86)	Yes (as made)	
Law Enforcement Integrity Legislation Amendment Act 2012	2012 (No. 194)	Yes (as made)	
Law Officers Act 1964	1964 (No. 91)	Yes (as amended)	
Law Reform Commission Act 1973	1973 (No. 221)	No	
Laying Chicken Levy Act 1988	1988 (No. 16)	No	
Laying Chicken Levy Collection Act 1988	1988 (No. 17)	No	
Legal Proceedings Control Act 1919	1919 (No. 30)	No	
Legislative Assembly of the Northern Territory (Remuneration and Allowances) Act 1978	1978 (No. 104)	No	
Legislative Drafting Institute Act 1974	1974 (No. 6)	No	
Legislative Instruments Act 2003	2003 (No. 139)	Yes (as amended)	
Legislative Instruments (Transitional Provisions and Consequential Amendments) Act 2003	2003 (No. 140)	No	
Leigh Creek North Coalfield to Marree (Conversion to Standard Gauge) Railway Act 1954	1954 (No. 74)	No	
Lemonthyme and Southern Forests (Commission of Inquiry) Act 1987	1987 (No. 13)	No	
Life Assurance Companies Act 1905	1908 (No. 12)	No	
Life Insurance Act 1945	1945 (No. 28)	No	
Life Insurance Act 1995	1995 (No. 4)	Yes (as amended)	
Life Insurance Policy Holders' Protection Levies Act 1991	1992 (No. 2)	No	
Life Insurance Policy Holders' Protection Levies Collection Act 1991	1992 (No. 3)	No	
Life Insurance Supervisory Levy Act 1989	1989 (No. 22)	No	
Life Insurance Supervisory Levy Determination Validation Act 2000	2000 (No. 16)	No	
Life Insurance Supervisory Levy Imposition Act 1998	1998 (No. 57)	Yes (as amended)	
Lighthouses Act 1911	1911 (No. 14)	No	
Limitation of Liability for Maritime Claims Act 1989	1989 (No. 151)	Yes (as amended)	
Liquefied Gas (Road Vehicle Use) Tax Act 1974	1974 (No. 76)	No	
Liquefied Gas (Road Vehicle Use) Tax Collection Act 1974	1974 (No. 77)	No	
Liquefied Petroleum Gas (Grants) Act 1980	1980 (No. 37)	No	
Liquid Fuel (Defence Stocks) Act 1949	1949 (No. 29)	No	
Liquid Fuel Emergency Act 1984	1984 (No. 5)	Yes (as amended)	
Liquid Fuel (Rationing) Act 1949	1949 (No. 51)	No	
Livestock Diseases Act 1978	1978 (No. 181)	No	
Live-stock Export Charge Act 1977	1977 (No. 68)	No	
Live-stock Export Charge Collection Act 1977	1977 (No. 69)	No	
Live-stock (Exporters) Export Charge Act 1997	1997 (No. 216)	No	
Live-stock (Producers) Export Charges Act 1997	1997 (No. 217)	No	
Live-stock Slaughter (Export Inspection Charge) Act 1979	1979 (No. 45)	No	
Live-stock Slaughter (Export Inspection Charge) Collection Act 1979	1979 (No. 46)	No	
Live-stock Slaughter (Export Inspection Charge) Validation Act 1984	1984 (No. 160)	No	
Live-stock Slaughter Levy Act 1964	1964 (No. 8)	No	
Live-stock Slaughter Levy Collection Act 1964	1964 (No. 9)	No	
Live-stock Slaughter (Processors) Levy Act 1997	1997 (No. 214)	No	
Live-stock Transactions Levy Act 1997	1997 (No. 215)	No	
Loan Consolidation and Investment Reserve Act 1955	1955 (No. 55)	No	
Loan Fund Expenditure Act 1933	1933 (No. 16)	No	
Loans Redemption and Conversion Act 1921	1921 (No. 18)	Yes (as amended)	
Loans Securities Act 1919	1919 (No. 25)	Yes (as amended)	
Loans Sinking Fund Act 1918	1918 (No. 6)	No	
Loans (Taxation Exemption) Act 1978	1978 (No. 160)	Yes (as made)	
Local Government (Financial Assistance) Act 1986	1986 (No. 79)	No	
Local Government (Financial Assistance) Act 1995	1995 (No. 86)	Yes (as amended)	
Local Government Grants Act 1974	1974 (No. 100)	No	
Local Government Grants Act 1975	1975 (No. 114)	No	
Local Government (Personal Income Tax Sharing) Act 1976	1976 (No. 123)	No	
Local Government (Personal Income Tax Sharing) Amendment Act 1984	1984 (No. 71)	No	
Long Service Leave (Commonwealth Employees) Act 1976	1976 (No. 192)	Yes (as amended)	
Low Aromatic Fuel Act 2013	2013 (No. 1)	Yes (as amended)	
Main Roads Development Act 1923	1923 (No. 2)	No	
Maintenance Orders (Commonwealth Officers) Act 1966	1966 (No. 59)	Yes (as amended)	
Major Bank Levy Act 2017	2017 (No. 63)	Yes (as made)	
Major Sporting Events (Indicia and Images) Protection Act 2014	2014 (No. 29)	Yes (as amended)	
Management and Investment Companies Act 1983	1983 (No. 123)	No	
Mandarin Growers Relief Act 1934	1934 (No. 27)	No	
Manufactures Encouragement Act 1908	1908 (No. 26)	No	
Marginal Dairy Farms Agreements Act 1970	1970 (No. 35)	No	
Marine Insurance Act 1909	1909 (No. 11)	Yes (as amended)	
Marine Navigation Levy Act 1989	1989 (No. 161)	Yes (as amended)	
Marine Navigation Levy Collection Act 1989	1989 (No. 162)	Yes (as amended)	
Marine Navigation (Regulatory Functions) Levy Act 1991	1991 (No. 40)	Yes (as amended)	
Marine Navigation (Regulatory Functions) Levy Collection Act 1991	1991 (No. 41)	Yes (as amended)	
Marine Safety (Domestic Commercial Vessel) National Law Act 2012	2012 (No. 121)	Yes (as amended)	
Marine Safety (Domestic Commercial Vessel) National Law (Consequential Amendments) Act 2012	2012 (No. 122)	Yes (as made)	
Maritime College Act 1976	1976 (No. 84)	No	
Maritime College Act 1978	1978 (No. 54)	No	
Maritime Legislation Amendment Act 2007	2007 (No. 150)	Yes (as amended)	
Maritime Powers Act 2013	2013 (No. 15)	Yes (as amended)	
Maritime Powers (Consequential Amendments) Act 2013	2013 (No. 16)	Yes (as made)	
Maritime Transport Security Act 2003	2003 (No. 131)	Yes (as amended)	
Marriage Act 1961	1961 (No. 12)	Yes (as amended)	
Marriage (Celebrant Registration Charge) Act 2014	2014 (No. 24)	Yes (as made)	
Marriage Law Survey (Additional Safeguards) Act 2017	2017 (No. 96)	No	
Marriage (Overseas) Act 1955	1955 (No. 31)	No	
Maternity Allowance Act 1912	1912 (No. 8)	No	
Maternity Leave (Australian Government Employees) Act 1973	1973 (No. 72)	Yes (as amended)	
Matrimonial Causes Act 1945	1945 (No. 22)	No	
Matrimonial Causes Act 1959	1959 (No. 104)	No	
Matrimonial Causes Act 1971	1971 (No. 102)	No	
Matrimonial Causes (Expeditionary Forces) Act 1919	1919 (No. 15)	No	
Meat Agreement (Deficiency Payments) Act 1955	1955 (No. 32)	No	
Meat and Live-stock Industry Act 1995	1995 (No. 67)	No	
Meat and Live-stock Industry Legislation Repeal Act 1995	1995 (No. 69)	No	
Meat Chicken Levy Act 1969	1969 (No. 36)	No	
Meat Chicken Levy Collection Act 1969	1969 (No. 37)	No	
Meat Export (Additional Charge) Act 1955	1955 (No. 33)	No	
Meat Export (Additional Charge) Act 1956	1956 (No. 2)	No	
Meat Export Bounties Act 1922	1922 (No. 11)	No	
Meat Export Bounties Act 1923	1923 (No. 4)	No	
Meat Export Charge Act 1973	1973 (No. 125)	No	
Meat Export Charge Act 1984	1984 (No. 153)	No	
Meat Export Charge Amendment Act 1976	1976 (No. 8)	No	
Meat Export Charge Collection Act 1973	1973 (No. 126)	No	
Meat Export Charge Collection Act 1984	1984 (No. 154)	No	
Meat Export Charge Repeal Act 1964	1964 (No. 10)	No	
Meat Export Charges Act 1935	1935 (No. 53)	No	
Meat Export Control Act 1935	1935 (No. 52)	No	
Meat Export Control Act 1955	1955 (No. 51)	No	
Meat Export (Penalties) Act 1981	1981 (No. 149)	No	
Meat Export Trade Commission Act 1914	1914 (No. 1)	No	
Meat Industry Act 1964	1964 (No. 7)	No	
Meat Industry Control Act 1946	1946 (No. 37)	No	
Meat Industry Encouragement Act 1924	1924 (No. 55)	No	
Meat Inspection Act 1983	1983 (No. 71)	No	
Meat Inspection Arrangements Act 1964	1964 (No. 100)	No	
Meat Legislation Repeal Act 1968	1968 (No. 143)	No	
Meat Research Act 1965	1965 (No. 75)	No	
Meat Research Act 1968	1968 (No. 142)	No	
Meat Research Amendment Act 1977	1977 (No. 72)	No	
Meat Research Amendment Act 1979	1979 (No. 77)	No	
Medibank Private Sale Act 2006	2006 (No. 160)	Yes (as amended)	
Medical Indemnity Act 2002	2002 (No. 132)	Yes (as amended)	
Medical Indemnity Agreement (Financial Assistance—Binding Commonwealth Obligations) Act 2002	2002 (No. 111)	Yes (as made)	
Medical Indemnity (Competitive Advantage Payment) Act 2005	2005 (No. 125)	Yes (as made)	
Medical Indemnity (Enhanced UMP Indemnity) Contribution Act 2002	2002 (No. 134)	No	
Medical Indemnity (IBNR Indemnity) Contribution Act 2002	2002 (No. 135)	Yes (as amended)	
Medical Indemnity (Prudential Supervision and Product Standards) Act 2003	2003 (No. 37)	Yes (as amended)	
Medical Indemnity (Run-off Cover Support Payment) Act 2004	2004 (No. 76)	Yes (as amended)	
Medical Research Endowment Act 1937	1937 (No. 6)	No	
Medical Research Future Fund Act 2015	2015 (No. 116)	Yes (as amended)	
Medicare Guarantee Act 2017	2017 (No. 71)	Yes (as made)	
Medicare Levy Act 1983	1983 (No. 52)	No	
Medicare Levy Act 1984	1984 (No. 101)	No	
Medicare Levy Act 1985	1985 (No. 126)	No	
Medicare Levy Act 1986	1986 (No. 110)	Yes (as amended)	
Melbourne 2006 Commonwealth Games (Indicia and Images) Protection Act 2005	2005 (No. 68)	No	
Members of Parliament (Life Gold Pass) Act 2002	2002 (No. 110)	Yes (as amended)	
Members of Parliament (Staff) Act 1984	1984 (No. 64)	Yes (as amended)	
Menindee Lakes Storage Agreement Act 1963	1963 (No. 99)	No	
Mental Health and Related Services Assistance Act 1973	1973 (No. 154)	No	
Mental Institution Benefits Act 1948	1948 (No. 78)	No	
Merit Protection (Australian Government Employees) Act 1984	1984 (No. 65)	No	
Metal Working Machine Tools Bounty Act 1972	1972 (No. 115)	No	
Meteorology Act 1906	1906 (No. 3)	No	
Meteorology Act 1955	1955 (No. 6)	Yes (as amended)	
Metric Conversion Act 1970	1970 (No. 16)	No	
Midwife Professional Indemnity (Commonwealth Contribution) Scheme Act 2010	2010 (No. 30)	Yes (as amended)	
Midwife Professional Indemnity (Run-off Cover Support Payment) Act 2010	2010 (No. 31)	Yes (as amended)	
Migrant Settlement Agreement Act 1933	1933 (No. 32)	No	
Migration Act 1958	1958 (No. 62)	Yes (as amended)	
Migration Agents Registration Application Charge Act 1997	1997 (No. 203)	Yes (as amended)	
Migration Agents Registration (Application) Levy Act 1992	1992 (No. 86)	No	
Migration Agents Registration Renewal Charge Act 1997	1997 (No. 204)	No	
Migration Agents Registration (Renewal) Levy Act 1992	1992 (No. 87)	No	
Migration (Delayed Visa Applications) Tax Act 1992	1992 (No. 178)	No	
Migration (Health Services) Charge Act 1991	1991 (No. 197)	Yes (as amended)	
Migration (Skilling Australians Fund) Charges Act 2018	2018 (No. 39)	Yes (as made)	
Migration (Sponsorship Fees) Act 2007	2007 (No. 110)	Yes (as made)	
Migration (Visa Application) Charge Act 1997	1997 (No. 26)	Yes (as amended)	
Migration (Visa Evidence) Charge Act 2012	2012 (No. 124)	No	
Military Justice (Interim Measures) Act (No. 2) 2009	2009 (No. 92)	Yes (as made)	
Military Memorials of National Significance Act 2008	2008 (No. 80)	Yes (as made)	
Military Rehabilitation and Compensation Act 2004	2004 (No. 51)	Yes (as amended)	
Military Rehabilitation and Compensation (Consequential and Transitional Provisions) Act 2004	2004 (No. 52)	Yes (as amended)	
Military Service Referendum Act 1916	1916 (No. 27)	No	
Military Superannuation and Benefits Act 1991	1991 (No. 135)	Yes (as amended)	
Minerals Resource Rent Tax Act 2012	2012 (No. 13)	No	
Minerals Resource Rent Tax (Consequential Amendments and Transitional Provisions) Act 2012	2012 (No. 14)	Yes (as amended)	
Minerals Resource Rent Tax (Imposition—Customs) Act 2012	2012 (No. 15)	No	
Minerals Resource Rent Tax (Imposition—Excise) Act 2012	2012 (No. 16)	No	
Minerals Resource Rent Tax (Imposition—General) Act 2012	2012 (No. 17)	No	
Minerals Resource Rent Tax Repeal and Other Measures Act 2014	2014 (No. 96)	Yes (as amended)	
Minerals (Submerged Lands) Act 1981	1981 (No. 81)	No	
Minerals (Submerged Lands) (Exploration Permit Fees) Act 1981	1981 (No. 83)	Yes (as amended)	
Minerals (Submerged Lands) (Production Licence Fees) Act 1981	1981 (No. 84)	Yes (as amended)	
Minerals (Submerged Lands) (Registration Fees) Act 1981	1981 (No. 86)	Yes (as amended)	
Minerals (Submerged Lands) (Royalty) Act 1981	1981 (No. 82)	Yes (as amended)	
Minerals (Submerged Lands) (Works Authority Fees) Act 1981	1981 (No. 85)	Yes (as amended)	
Ministers of State Act 1915	1915 (No. 18)	No	
Ministers of State Act 1917	1917 (No. 40)	No	
Ministers of State Act 1935	1935 (No. 35)	No	
Ministers of State Act 1952	1952 (No. 1)	Yes (as amended)	
Mint Employees Act 1964	1964 (No. 45)	No	
Modern Slavery Act 2018	2018 (No. 153)	Yes (as made)	
Moomba-Sydney Pipeline System Sale Act 1994	1994 (No. 70)	Yes (as amended)	
Moratorium Act 1919	1919 (No. 2)	No	
Morgan-Whyalla Waterworks Agreement Act 1940	1940 (No. 75)	No	
Motor Industry Bounty Act 1938	1938 (No. 54)	No	
Motor Vehicle Engine Bounty Act 1939	1939 (No. 69)	No	
Motor Vehicle Standards Act 1989	1989 (No. 65)	Yes (as amended)	
Motor Vehicles Agreement Act 1940	1940 (No. 31)	No	
Motor Vehicles Manufacture Legislation Repeal Act 1945	1945 (No. 1)	No	
Mount Stromlo Observatory Act 1956	1956 (No. 79)	No	
Multilateral Investment Guarantee Agency Act 1997	1997 (No. 126)	Yes (as amended)	
Murray-Darling Basin Act 1993	1993 (No. 38)	No	
Museum of Australia Act 1980	1980 (No. 115)	Yes (as amended)	
Mutual Assistance in Business Regulation Act 1992	1992 (No. 25)	Yes (as amended)	
Mutual Assistance in Criminal Matters Act 1987	1978 (No. 85)	Yes (as amended)	
Mutual Recognition Act 1992	1992 (No. 198)	Yes (as amended)	
Narcotic Drugs Act 1967	1967 (No. 53)	Yes (as amended)	
Narcotic Drugs (Licence Charges) Act 2016	2016 (No. 75)	Yes (as made)	
National Blood Authority Act 2003	2003 (No. 29)	Yes (as amended)	
National Broadband Network Companies Act 2011	2011 (No. 22)	Yes (as amended)	
National Cancer Screening Register Act 2016	2016 (No. 65)	Yes (as amended)	
National Cancer Screening Register (Consequential and Transitional Provisions) Act 2016	2016 (No. 66)	Yes (as made)	
National Capital Development Commission Act 1957	1957 (No. 42)	No	
National Capital Development Commission Act 1960	1960 (No. 83)	No	
National Capital Development Commission Act 1975	1975 (No. 66)	No	
National Cattle Disease Eradication Trust Account Act 1991	1991 (No. 23)	Yes (as amended)	
National Companies and Securities Commission Act 1979	1979 (No. 173)	No	
National Consumer Credit Protection Act 2009	2009 (No. 134)	Yes (as amended)	
National Consumer Credit Protection (Fees) Act 2009	2009 (No. 112)	Yes (as amended)	
National Consumer Credit Protection (Transitional and Consequential Provisions) Act 2009	2009 (No. 135)	Yes (as amended)	
National Crime Authority Act 1984	1984 (No. 41)	Yes (as amended)	
National Crime Authority (Status and Rights of Chairman) Act 1984	1984 (No. 105)	Yes (as amended)	
National Crimes Commission Act 1982	1982 (No. 138)	No	
National Debt Sinking Fund Act 1923	1923 (No. 5)	No	
National Debt Sinking Fund Act 1966	1966 (No. 65)	No	
National Debt Sinking Fund Repeal Act 1994	1994 (No. 107)	No	
National Debt Sinking Fund (Special Payment) Act 1951	1951 (No. 80)	No	
National Disability Insurance Scheme Act 2013	2013 (No. 20)	Yes (as amended)	
National Emergency (Coal Strike) Act 1949	1949 (No. 20)	No	
National Environment Protection Council Act 1994	1994 (No. 126)	Yes (as amended)	
National Environment Protection Measures (Implementation) Act 1998	1998 (No. 129)	Yes (as amended)	
National Film and Sound Archive Act 2008	2008 (No. 14)	Yes (as amended)	
National Firearms Program Implementation Act 1996	1996 (No. 34)	No	
National Firearms Program Implementation Act 1997	1997 (No. 149)	No	
National Firearms Program Implementation Act 1998	1998 (No. 81)	No	
National Fitness Act 1941	1941 (No. 26)	No	
National Food Authority Act 1991	1991 (No. 118)	Yes (as amended)	
National Gallery Act 1975	1975 (No. 61)	Yes (as amended)	
National Gambling Reform Act 2012	2012 (No. 193)	Yes (as amended)	
National Gambling Reform (Related Matters) Act (No. 1) 2012	2012 (No. 189)	No	
National Gambling Reform (Related Matters) Act (No. 2) 2012	2012 (No. 190)	No	
National Greenhouse and Energy Reporting Act 2007	2007 (No. 175)	Yes (as amended)	
National Guarantee Fund (Members of Participating Exchanges) Levy Act 1989	1989 (No. 116)	No	
National Guarantee Fund (Participating Exchanges) Levy Act 1989	1989 (No. 115)	No	
National Guarantee Fund (Reportable Transactions) Levy Act 1989	1989 (No. 114)	No	
National Handgun Buyback Act 2003	2003 (No. 60)	No	
National Health Act 1953	1953 (No. 95)	Yes (as amended)	
National Health Act 1973	1973 (No. 49)	No	
National Health Amendment Act 1976	1976 (No. 60)	No	
National Health Amendment Act 1978	1978 (No. 88)	No	
National Health Amendment (Pharmaceutical Benefits Scheme) Act 2012	2012 (No. 87)	Yes (as made)	
National Health and Hospitals Network Act 2011	2011 (No. 9)	Yes (as amended)	
National Health and Medical Research Council Act 1992	1992 (No. 225)	Yes (as amended)	
National Health and Pensions Insurance Act 1938	1938 (No. 25)	No	
National Health and Pensions Insurance Act 1939	1939 (No. 4)	No	
National Health and Pensions Insurance (Employees' Contributions) Act 1938	1938 (No. 27)	No	
National Health and Pensions Insurance (Employers' Contributions) Act 1938	1938 (No. 26)	No	
National Health (Pharmaceutical Benefits Charges) Act 1975	1975 (No. 93)	No	
National Health Reform Amendment (Independent Hospital Pricing Authority) Act 2011	2011 (No. 139)	Yes (as made)	
National Health Reform Amendment (National Health Performance Authority) Act 2011	2011 (No. 109)	Yes (as made)	
National Health Security Act 2007	2007 (No. 174)	Yes (as amended)	
National Health Security Amendment Act 2012	2012 (No. 182)	Yes (as made)	
National Health Service Act 1948	1948 (No. 81)	No	
National Housing Finance and Investment Corporation Act 2018	2018 (No. 65)	Yes (as amended)	
National Housing Finance and Investment Corporation (Consequential Amendments and Transitional Provisions) Act 2018	2018 (No. 66)	Yes (as made)	
National Labour Consultative Council Act 1977	1977 (No. 65)	Yes (as amended)	
National Library Act 1960	1960 (No. 69)	Yes (as amended)	
National Occupational Health and Safety Commission Act 1985	1985 (No. 35)	No	
National Oil Proprietary Limited Agreement Act 1937	1937 (No. 23)	No	
National Oil Proprietary Limited Agreement Act 1939	1939 (No. 47)	No	
National Parks and Wildlife Conservation Act 1975	1975 (No. 12)	No	
National Portrait Gallery of Australia Act 2012	2012 (No. 148)	Yes (as amended)	
National Portrait Gallery of Australia (Consequential and Transitional Provisions) Act 2012	2012 (No. 149)	Yes (as made)	
National Radioactive Waste Management Act 2012	2012 (No. 29)	Yes (as amended)	
National Rail Corporation Agreement Act 1992	1992 (No. 26)	No	
National Railway Network (Financial Assistance) Act 1979	1979 (No. 57)	No	
National Redress Scheme for Institutional Child Sexual Abuse Act 2018	2018 (No. 45)	Yes (as made)	
National Registration Act 1939	1939 (No. 11)	No	
National Rental Affordability Scheme Act 2008	2008 (No. 121)	Yes (as amended)	
National Residue Survey Administration Act 1992	1992 (No. 243)	Yes (as amended)	
National Residue Survey (Aquatic Animal Export) Levy Act 1992	1992 (No. 244)	No	
National Residue Survey (Buffalo Slaughter) Levy Act 1997	1997 (No. 218)	No	
National Residue Survey (Cattle Export) Levy Act 1995	1995 (No. 76)	No	
National Residue Survey (Cattle Export) Levy Act 1997	1997 (No. 220)	No	
National Residue Survey (Cattle Transactions) Levy Act 1992	1992 (No. 245)	No	
National Residue Survey (Cattle Transactions) Levy Act 1995	1995 (No. 77)	No	
National Residue Survey (Cattle Transactions) Levy Act 1997	1997 (No. 219)	No	
National Residue Survey (Coarse Grains) Levy Act 1992	1992 (No. 246)	No	
National Residue Survey (Consequential Provisions) Act 1992	1992 (No. 247)	Yes (as made)	
National Residue Survey (Customs) Levy Act 1998	1998 (No. 32)	Yes (as amended)	
National Residue Survey Customs Levy Rate Correction (Lamb Exports) Act 2004	2004 (No. 3)	No	
National Residue Survey (Dairy Produce) Levy Act 1992	1992 (No. 248)	No	
National Residue Survey (Dried Fruits) Levy Act 1992	1992 (No. 249)	No	
National Residue Survey (Excise) Levy Act 1998	1998 (No. 33)	Yes (as amended)	
National Residue Survey Excise Levy Rate Correction (Lamb Transactions) Act 2004	2004 (No. 4)	No	
National Residue Survey (Game Animals) Levy Act 1992	1992 (No. 250)	No	
National Residue Survey (Grain Legumes) Levy Act 1992	1992 (No. 251)	No	
National Residue Survey (Honey Export) Levy Act 1992	1992 (No. 253)	No	
National Residue Survey (Honey) Levy Act 1992	1992 (No. 252)	No	
National Residue Survey (Horse Slaughter) Levy Act 1992	1992 (No. 254)	No	
National Residue Survey (Horticultural Products Export) Levy Act 1992	1992 (No. 256)	No	
National Residue Survey (Horticultural Products) Levy Act 1992	1992 (No. 255)	No	
National Residue Survey (Laying Chicken) Levy Act 1992	1992 (No. 257)	No	
National Residue Survey Levies Regulations (Validation and Commencement of Amendments) Act 1999	1999 (No. 163)	Yes (as made)	
National Residue Survey (Livestock Slaughter) Levy Act 1992	1992 (No. 258)	No	
National Residue Survey (Meat Chicken) Levy Act 1992	1992 (No. 259)	No	
National Residue Survey (Oilseeds) Levy Act 1992	1992 (No. 260)	No	
National Residue Survey (Ratite Slaughter) Levy Act 1997	1997 (No. 93)	No	
National Residue Survey (Sheep, Lambs and Goats Export) Levy Act 1997	1997 (No. 222)	No	
National Residue Survey (Sheep, Lambs and Goats Transactions) Levy Act 1997	1997 (No. 221)	No	
National Residue Survey (Wheat) Levy Act 1992	1992 (No. 261)	No	
National Road Transport Commission Act 1991	1992 (No. 8)	No	
National Roads Act 1974	1974 (No. 52)	No	
National Security Act 1939	1939 (No. 15)	No	
National Security Act 1946	1946 (No. 15)	No	
National Security Information (Criminal Proceedings) Act 2004	2004 (No. 150)	Yes (as amended)	
National Self-exclusion Register (Cost Recovery Levy) Act 2019	2019 (No. 128)	Yes (as made)	
National Service Act 1951	1951 (No. 2)	No	
National Service Act 1953	1953 (No. 30)	No	
National Service Act 1957	1957 (No. 16)	No	
National Service Act 1964	1964 (No. 126)	No	
National Service Act 1965	1965 (No. 52)	No	
National Service Act 1968	1968 (No. 51)	No	
National Service Act 1971	1971 (No. 80)	No	
National Service Act (No. 2) 1951	1951 (No. 63)	No	
National Service Act (No. 2) 1957	1957 (No. 40)	No	
National Service (Discharge of Trainees) Act 1960	1960 (No. 28)	No	
National Service Termination Act 1973	1973 (No. 88)	No	
National Sports Tribunal Act 2019	2019 (No. 68)	Yes (as made)	
National Transmission Network Sale Act 1998	1998 (No. 130)	Yes (as amended)	
National Transport Commission Act 2003	2003 (No. 81)	Yes (as amended)	
National Urban and Regional Development Authority Act 1972	1972 (No. 117)	No	
National Vocational Education and Training Regulator Act 2011	2011 (No. 12)	Yes (as amended)	
National Vocational Education and Training Regulator (Charges) Act 2012	2012 (No. 105)	Yes (as amended)	
National Vocational Education and Training Regulator (Transitional Provisions) Act 2011	2011 (No. 13)	Yes (as amended)	
National Water Commission Act 2004	2004 (No. 156)	No	
National Water Resources (Financial Assistance) Act 1978	1978 (No. 5)	No	
National Welfare Fund Act 1943	1943 (No. 12)	No	
Nationality Act 1920	1920 (No. 48)	No	
Nationality Act 1946	1946 (No. 9)	No	
Nationality Act (No. 2) 1946	1946 (No. 28)	No	
Nationality and Citizenship Act 1948	1948 (No. 83)	No	
Nationality and Citizenship (Burmese) Act 1950	1950 (No. 12)	No	
Nation-building Funds Act 2008	2008 (No. 154)	No	
Nation-building Funds (Consequential Amendments) Act 2008	2008 (No. 155)	Yes (as made)	
Native Members of the Forces Benefits Act 1957	1957 (No. 89)	Yes (as amended)	
Native Title Act 1993	1993 (No. 110)	Yes (as amended)	
Native Title Amendment Act 1998	1998 (No. 97)	Yes (as amended)	
Natural Gas Pipeline (South Australia) Agreement Act 1967	1967 (No. 56)	No	
Natural Heritage Trust of Australia Act 1997	1997 (No. 76)	Yes (as amended)	
Natural Resources Management (Financial Assistance) Act 1992	1992 (No. 242)	Yes (as amended)	
Naturalization Act 1903	1903 (No. 11)	No	
Nauru Act 1965	1965 (No. 115)	No	
Nauru (High Court Appeals) Act 1976	1976 (No. 151)	Yes (as amended)	
Nauru Independence Act 1967	1967 (No. 103)	Yes (as made)	
Nauru Island Agreement Act 1919	1919 (No. 8)	No	
Nauru Island Agreement Act 1932	1932 (No. 54)	No	
Naval Agreement Act 1903	1903 (No. 8)	No	
Naval Appropriation Act 1910	1910 (No. 18)	No	
Naval Construction Act 1925	1925 (No. 24)	No	
Naval Defence Act 1910	1910 (No. 30)	No	
Naval Loan Act 1909	1909 (No. 14)	No	
Naval Loan Repeal Act 1910	1910 (No. 6)	No	
Naval Properties Transfer Act 1925	1925 (No. 19)	No	
Navigation Act 1912	1913 (No. 4)	No	
Navigation Act 2012	2012 (No. 128)	Yes (as amended)	
Navigation Amendment Act 1979	1979 (No. 98)	No	
New Business Tax System (Alienated Personal Services Income) Tax Imposition Act (No. 1) 2000	2000 (No. 87)	Yes (as made)	
New Business Tax System (Alienated Personal Services Income) Tax Imposition Act (No. 2) 2000	2000 (No. 88)	Yes (as made)	
New Business Tax System (Former Subsidiary Tax Imposition) Act 1999	1999 (No. 166)	Yes (as amended)	
New Business Tax System (Franking Deficit Tax) Act 2002	2002 (No. 50)	Yes (as amended)	
New Business Tax System (Over-franking Tax) Act 2002	2002 (No. 49)	Yes (as made)	
New Business Tax System (Untainting Tax) Act 2006	2006 (No. 81)	Yes (as made)	
New Business Tax System (Venture Capital Deficit Tax) Act 2000	2000 (No. 62)	No	
New Business Tax System (Venture Capital Deficit Tax) Act 2003	2003 (No. 17)	Yes (as amended)	
New Guinea Act 1920	1920 (No. 25)	No	
New Guinea Loan Guarantee Act 1938	1938 (No. 16)	No	
New Guinea Timber Agreement Act 1952	1952 (No. 40)	No	
New Guinea Timber Agreement Act (Repeal) Act 1972	1972 (No. 73)	No	
New Guinea Timber Rights Commission Act 1949	1949 (No. 1)	No	
New South Wales Flood Relief Act 1974	1974 (No. 14)	No	
New South Wales Grant (Chrysotile Corporation) Act 1978	1978 (No. 190)	No	
New South Wales Grant (Drought Relief) Act 1947	1947 (No. 43)	No	
New South Wales Grant (Flood Mitigation) Act 1964	1964 (No. 4)	No	
New South Wales Grant (Flood Mitigation) Act 1971	1971 (No. 10)	No	
New South Wales Grant (Gwydir River Dam) Act 1969	1969 (No. 53)	No	
New South Wales Grant (Leeton Co-operative Cannery Limited) Act 1971	1971 (No. 128)	No	
New South Wales Grant (Namoi River Weirs) Act 1976	1976 (No. 137)	No	
New Zealand Re-exports Act 1924	1924 (No. 21)	No	
New Zealand Re-exports (Repeal) Act 1977	1977 (No. 34)	No	
Newsprinting Paper Bounty Act 1938	1938 (No. 64)	No	
Nitrogenous Fertilizers Subsidy Act 1966	1966 (No. 78)	No	
Non-government Schools (Loans Guarantee) Act 1977	1977 (No. 106)	No	
Norfolk Island Act 1913	1913 (No. 15)	No	
Norfolk Island Act 1957	1957 (No. 29)	No	
Norfolk Island Act 1979	1979 (No. 25)	Yes (as amended)	
Norfolk Island Ordinances Act 1957	1957 (No. 28)	No	
Northern Australia Act 1926	1926 (No. 16)	No	
Northern Australia Infrastructure Facility Act 2016	2016 (No. 41)	Yes (as made)	
Northern Australia Survey Act 1934	1934 (No. 61)	No	
Northern Prawn Fishery Voluntary Adjustment Scheme Loan Guarantee Act 1985	1985 (No. 111)	No	
Northern Territory Acceptance Act 1910	1910 (No. 20)	Yes (as amended)	
Northern Territory Acceptance Act 1919	1919 (No. 24)	No	
Northern Territory (Administration) Act 1910	1910 (No. 27)	No	
Northern Territory (Administration) Act 1926	1926 (No. 19)	No	
Northern Territory (Administration) Act 1933	1933 (No. 18)	No	
Northern Territory (Administration) Act 1939	1939 (No. 85)	No	
Northern Territory (Administration) Act 1940	1940 (No. 20)	No	
Northern Territory (Administration) Act 1947	1947 (No. 39)	No	
Northern Territory (Administration) Act 1949	1949 (No. 53)	No	
Northern Territory (Administration) Act 1952	1952 (No. 71)	No	
Northern Territory (Administration) Act 1953	1953 (No. 89)	No	
Northern Territory (Administration) Act 1955	1955 (No. 71)	No	
Northern Territory (Administration) Act 1956	1956 (No. 50)	No	
Northern Territory (Administration) Act 1959	1959 (No. 28)	No	
Northern Territory (Administration) Act 1961	1961 (No. 68)	No	
Northern Territory (Administration) Act 1962	1962 (No. 77)	No	
Northern Territory (Administration) Act 1965	1965 (No. 69)	No	
Northern Territory (Administration) Act 1968	1968 (No. 5)	No	
Northern Territory (Administration) Act 1969	1969 (No. 88)	No	
Northern Territory (Administration) Act 1972	1972 (No. 39)	No	
Northern Territory (Administration) Act 1973	1973 (No. 9)	No	
Northern Territory (Administration) Act 1974	1974 (No. 30)	No	
Northern Territory (Administration) Act (No. 2) 1931	1931 (No. 7)	No	
Northern Territory (Administration) Act (No. 2) 1940	1940 (No. 87)	No	
Northern Territory (Administration) Act (No. 2) 1956	1956 (No. 110)	No	
Northern Territory (Administration) Act (No. 2) 1968	1968 (No. 47)	No	
Northern Territory (Administration) Amendment Act 1976	1976 (No. 66)	No	
Northern Territory (Commonwealth Lands) Act 1980	1980 (No. 74)	Yes (as made)	
Northern Territory Grant (Electricity) Act 1989	1989 (No. 49)	No	
Northern Territory Grant (Special Assistance) Act 1983	1983 (No. 83)	No	
Northern Territory (Lessees' Loans Guarantee) Act 1954	1954 (No. 59)	Yes (as amended)	
Northern Territory National Emergency Response Act 2007	2007 (No. 129)	No	
Northern Territory Railway Extension Act 1923	1923 (No. 11)	No	
Northern Territory Railway Extension Act 1971	1971 (No. 25)	No	
Northern Territory Representation Act 1922	1922 (No. 18)	No	
Northern Territory (Self-Government) Act 1978	1978 (No. 58)	Yes (as amended)	
Northern Territory Supreme Court Act 1961	1961 (No. 11)	No	
Northern Territory Supreme Court Act 1975	1975 (No. 84)	No	
Northern Territory Supreme Court Amendment Act (No. 2) 1978	1978 (No. 64)	No	
Northern Territory Supreme Court (Repeal) Act 1979	1979 (No. 85)	No	
Not-for-profit Sector Freedom to Advocate Act 2013	2013 (No. 56)	Yes (as made)	
NRS Levy Imposition Act 1998	1998 (No. 3)	No	
Nuclear Non-Proliferation (Safeguards) Act 1987	1987 (No. 5)	Yes (as amended)	
Nuclear Safeguards (Producers of Uranium Ore Concentrates) Charge Act 1993	1993 (No. 34)	Yes (as made)	
Nuclear Terrorism Legislation Amendment Act 2012	2012 (No. 3)	Yes (as made)	
Nursing Home Charge (Imposition) Act 1994	1994 (No. 18)	No	
Nursing Homes Assistance Act 1974	1974 (No. 147)	No	
Occupational Health and Safety (Commonwealth Employment) Act 1991	1991 (No. 30)	No	
Occupational Health and Safety (Maritime Industry) Act 1993	1994 (No. 10)	Yes (as amended)	
Occupational Superannuation Standards Act 1987	1987 (No. 97)	Yes (as amended)	
Occupational Superannuation Standards Regulations Application Act 1992	1992 (No. 128)	No	
Office of National Assessments Act 1977	1977 (No. 107)	No	
Office of National Intelligence Act 2018	2018 (No. 155)	Yes (as made)	
Office of National Intelligence (Consequential and Transitional Provisions) Act 2018	2018 (No. 156)	Yes (as made)	
Officers' Compensation Act 1908	1908 (No. 4)	No	
Officers' Compensation Act 1909	1909 (No. 24)	No	
Officers' Compensation Act 1912	1912 (No. 36)	No	
Officer's Compensation Act 1915	1915 (No. 49)	No	
Officers' Compensation Act 1915	1915 (No. 27)	No	
Officers' Rights Declaration Act 1928	1928 (No. 16)	No	
Offshore Minerals Act 1994	1994 (No. 28)	Yes (as amended)	
Offshore Minerals (Retention Licence Fees) Act 1994	1994 (No. 30)	Yes (as made)	
Offshore Petroleum Act 2006	2006 (No. 14)	Yes (as amended)	
Offshore Petroleum and Greenhouse Gas Storage Amendment (Compliance Measures) Act 2013	2013 (No. 11)	Yes (as amended)	
Offshore Petroleum (Annual Fees) Act 2006	2006 (No. 15)	No	
Offshore Petroleum (Registration Fees) Act 2006	2006 (No. 16)	No	
Offshore Petroleum (Royalty) Act 2006	2006 (No. 18)	Yes (as amended)	
Offshore Petroleum (Safety Levies) Act 2003	2003 (No. 117)	Yes (as amended)	
Oil Agreement Act 1920	1920 (No. 13)	No	
Oil Agreement Act 1924	1924 (No. 7)	No	
Oil Agreement Act 1926	1926 (No. 14)	No	
Oil Agreement Act 1952	1952 (No. 80)	No	
Oil Companies (Stock Loss Reimbursement) Act 1986	1986 (No. 18)	No	
Oilseeds Levy Act 1977	1977 (No. 112)	No	
Oilseeds Levy Collection and Research Act 1977	1977 (No. 113)	No	
Olympic Insignia Protection Act 1987	1987 (No. 27)	Yes (as amended)	
Ombudsman Act 1976	1976 (No. 181)	Yes (as amended)	
Oodnadatta to Alice Springs Railway Act 1926	1926 (No. 3)	No	
Orange Bounty Act 1935	1935 (No. 49)	No	
Orange Bounty Act 1936	1936 (No. 5)	No	
Orange Bounty Act (No. 2) 1936	1936 (No. 44)	No	
Ordinances and Regulations (Notification) Act 1972	1972 (No. 75)	No	
Ordinances and Regulations (Notification) Act 1978	1978 (No. 38)	Yes (as made)	
Organisation for Economic Co-operation and Development (Financial Support Fund) Act 1976	1976 (No. 86)	No	
Pacific Island Labourers Act 1901	1901 (No. 16)	No	
Pipeline Authority Act 1973	1973 (No. 42)	No	
Post and Telegraph Act 1901	1901 (No. 12)	No	
Product Stewardship Act 2011	2011		
Property for Public Purposes Acquisition Act 1901	1901 (No. 13)	No	
Punishment of Offences Act 1901	1901 (No. 14)	No	
Quarantine Act 1908	1908 (No. 3)	Yes (as amended)	
Seat of Government Act 1904	1904 (No. 7)	No	
Seat of Government Act 1908		No	
Seat of Government Acceptance Act 1909		No	
Seat of Government (Administration) Act 1910		No	
Service and Execution of Process Act 1901	1901 (No. 11)	No	
State Laws and Records Recognition Act 1901	1901 (No. 5)	No	
Statute Law Revision Act 2002	2002 (No. 63)	Yes (as amended)	
Statute Law Revision Act 2005	2005 (No. 100)	Yes (as made)	
Statute Law Revision Act 2006	2006 (No. 9)	Yes (as amended)	
Statute Law Revision Act 2008	2008 (No. 73)	Yes (as made)	
Statute Law Revision Act 2010	2010 (No. 8)	Yes (as amended)	
Statute Law Revision Act 2011	2011 (No. 5)	Yes (as amended)	
Telecommunications (Interception and Access) Act 1979	1979 (No. 114)	Yes (as amended)	
Trade Practices Act 1974	1974 (No. 51)	Yes (as amended)	
War Precautions Act 1914	1914 (No. 10)	No	
War-time Refugees Removal Act 1949	1949 (No. 32)	No	
Workplace Relations Amendment (Work Choices) Act 2005	2005 (No. 153)	Yes (as amended)	
World Heritage Properties Conservation Act 1983	1983 (No. 5)	No	

Note: This list does not include Appropriation Acts, Customs Tariff Acts, Excise Tariffs, Excise Tariff Validation Acts, Income Tax Acts, Loan Acts or Supply Acts.

== Amending acts ==
Title of act	Year passed	Principle act Amended	Text of act
Aboriginal and Torres Strait Islander Amendment (Indigenous Land Corporation) Act 2018	2018 (No. 144)	Aboriginal and Torres Strait Islander Act 2005	
Aboriginal and Torres Strait Islander Commission Amendment Act 1993	1993 (No. 26)	Aboriginal and Torres Strait Islander Commission Act 1989	
Aboriginal and Torres Strait Islander Commission Amendment Act (No. 2) 1993	1993 (No. 37)	Aboriginal and Torres Strait Islander Commission Act 1989	
Aboriginal and Torres Strait Islander Commission Amendment Act (No. 3) 1993	1994 (No. 1)	Aboriginal and Torres Strait Islander Commission Act 1989	
Aboriginal and Torres Strait Islander Commission Amendment Act 1994	1994 (No. 100)	Aboriginal and Torres Strait Islander Commission Act 1989	
Aboriginal and Torres Strait Islander Commission Amendment Act 1996	1996 (No. 35)	Aboriginal and Torres Strait Islander Commission Act 1989	
Aboriginal and Torres Strait Islander Commission Amendment Act 1998	1998 (No. 20)	Aboriginal and Torres Strait Islander Commission Act 1989	
Aboriginal and Torres Strait Islander Commission Amendment Act 2001	2001 (No. 4)	Aboriginal and Torres Strait Islander Commission Act 1989	
Aboriginal and Torres Strait Islander Commission Amendment Act 2002	2002 (No. 40)	Aboriginal and Torres Strait Islander Commission Act 1989	
Aboriginal and Torres Strait Islander Commission Amendment Act 2005	2005 (No. 32)	Aboriginal and Torres Strait Islander Commission Act 1989	
Aboriginal and Torres Strait Islander Commission Amendment Act (No. 1) 1999	1999 (No. 120)	Aboriginal and Torres Strait Islander Commission Act 1989	
Aboriginal and Torres Strait Islander Commission Amendment (TRSA) Act 1997	1997 (No. 98)	Aboriginal and Torres Strait Islander Commission Act 1989	
Aboriginal and Torres Strait Islander Heritage (Interim Protection) Amendment Act 1986	1986 (No. 83)	Aboriginal and Torres Strait Islander Heritage (Interim Protection) Act 1984	
Aboriginal and Torres Strait Islander Heritage Protection Amendment Act 1987	1987 (No. 39)	Aboriginal and Torres Strait Islander Heritage Protection Act 1984	
Aboriginal and Torres Strait Islander Heritage Protection Amendment Act 2006	2006 (No. 152)	Aboriginal and Torres Strait Islander Heritage Protection Act 1984	
Aboriginal Councils and Associations Amendment Act 1978	1978 (No. 56)	Aboriginal Councils and Associations Act 1976	

== See also ==
- Lists of acts of Australia
- Parliament of Australia
