= List of acts of the Parliament of Western Australia =

This is an incomplete list of acts of the Parliament of Western Australia.

== 19th century ==
=== 1832-1839 ===
The Legislative Council of Western Australia was created in 1832 as an appointed body. It had powers under the Government of Western Australia Act 1829 (10 Geo. 4. c. 22 (Imp)) to make ordinances for the colony. Initially the powers were granted for just a couple of years, but were successively extended by the Western Australia Government Act 1835 (5 & 6 Will. 4. c. 14 (Imp)), the Western Australia Government Act 1836, the Western Australia Government Act 1838.

- List of ordinances of the Legislative Council of Western Australia from 1832 (2 Will. IV)
- List of ordinances of the Legislative Council of Western Australia from 1833 (3 Will. IV; 4 Will. IV. Nos. 2-3)
- List of ordinances of the Legislative Council of Western Australia from 1834 (4 Will. IV. Nos. 1, 4-5; 5 Will. IV. Nos. 1-5)
- List of ordinances of the Legislative Council of Western Australia from 1835 (5 Will. IV. No. 6)
- List of ordinances of the Legislative Council of Western Australia from 1836 (6 Will. IV)
- List of ordinances of the Legislative Council of Western Australia from 1837 (7 Will. IV)
- List of ordinances of the Legislative Council of Western Australia from 1838 (1 Vict.)
- List of ordinances of the Legislative Council of Western Australia from 1839 (2 Vict.; 3 Vict.)

=== 1840-1849 ===
The Government of Western Australia Act 1829 was extended further by the Western Australia Government Act 1841, the Western Australia Government Act 1842 and the Western Australia Government Act 1846.

- List of ordinances of the Legislative Council of Western Australia from 1840 (4 Vict.)
- List of ordinances of the Legislative Council of Western Australia from 1841 (4 & 5 Vict.)
- List of ordinances of the Legislative Council of Western Australia from 1842 (6 Vict.)
- List of ordinances of the Legislative Council of Western Australia from 1843 (7 Vict. Nos. 1-10)
- List of ordinances of the Legislative Council of Western Australia from 1844 (7 Vict. Nos. 11-16; 8 Vict. Nos. 1-10)
- List of ordinances of the Legislative Council of Western Australia from 1845 (8 Vict. Nos. 11-12; 9 Vict. Nos. 1-6)
- List of ordinances of the Legislative Council of Western Australia from 1846 (9 Vict. Nos. 7-11)
- List of ordinances of the Legislative Council of Western Australia from 1847 (10 Vict. Nos. 1-20)
- List of ordinances of the Legislative Council of Western Australia from 1848 (10 Vict. No. 21; 12 Vict. Nos. 1-5)
- List of ordinances of the Legislative Council of Western Australia from 1849 (12 Vict. Nos. 6-25; 13 Vict. No. 1)

=== 1850-1859 ===
- List of ordinances of the Legislative Council of Western Australia from 1850 (13 Vict. No. 2; 14 Vict. Nos. 1-16)
- List of ordinances of the Legislative Council of Western Australia from 1851 (14 Vict. Nos. 17-26; 15 Vict. Nos. 1-4)
- List of ordinances of the Legislative Council of Western Australia from 1852 (15 Vict. Nos. 5-9; 16 Vict. Nos. 1-10)
- List of ordinances of the Legislative Council of Western Australia from 1853 (16 Vict. Nos. 11-23)
- List of ordinances of the Legislative Council of Western Australia from 1854 (17 Vict.)
- List of ordinances of the Legislative Council of Western Australia from 1855 (18 Vict.; 19 Vict. Nos. 1-2)
- List of ordinances of the Legislative Council of Western Australia from 1856 (19 Vict. Nos. 3-16; 20 Vict.)
- List of ordinances of the Legislative Council of Western Australia from 1857 (21 Vict. Nos. 1-11)
- List of ordinances of the Legislative Council of Western Australia from 1858 (21 Vict. No. 12; 22 Vict.)
- List of ordinances of the Legislative Council of Western Australia from 1859 (23 Vict. Nos. 1-12)

=== 1860-1869 ===
- List of ordinances of the Legislative Council of Western Australia from 1860 (23 Vict. Nos. 13-14; 24 Vict. Nos. 1-14)
- List of ordinances of the Legislative Council of Western Australia from 1861 (24 Vict. Nos. 15-16; 25 Vict. Nos. 1-15)
- List of ordinances of the Legislative Council of Western Australia from 1862 (25 Vict. Nos. 16-19)
- List of ordinances of the Legislative Council of Western Australia from 1863 (27 Vict.)
- List of ordinances of the Legislative Council of Western Australia from 1864 (28 Vict.)
- List of ordinances of the Legislative Council of Western Australia from 1865 (29 Vict.)
- List of ordinances of the Legislative Council of Western Australia from 1866 (30 Vict.)
- List of ordinances of the Legislative Council of Western Australia from 1867 (31 Vict.)
- List of ordinances of the Legislative Council of Western Australia from 1868 (32 Vict.)
- List of ordinances of the Legislative Council of Western Australia from 1869 (33 Vict. Nos. 1-12)

=== 1870-1879 ===
- List of ordinances of the Legislative Council of Western Australia from 1870 (33 Vict. Nos. 13-15)

In 1871 the Legislative Council became an elected body under the terms of the Australian Constitutions Act 1850 (13 & 14 Vict. c. 59 (Imp)).

- List of acts of the Legislative Council of Western Australia from 1871 (34 Vict.; 35 Vict.)
- List of acts of the Legislative Council of Western Australia from 1872 (36 Vict.)
- List of acts of the Legislative Council of Western Australia from 1873 (37 Vict.)
- List of acts of the Legislative Council of Western Australia from 1874 (38 Vict.)
- List of acts of the Legislative Council of Western Australia from 1875 (39 Vict. Nos. 1-18)
- List of acts of the Legislative Council of Western Australia from 1876 (39 Vict. Nos. 19-21; 40 Vict.)
- List of acts of the Legislative Council of Western Australia from 1877 (41 Vict.)
- List of acts of the Legislative Council of Western Australia from 1878 (42 Vict. Nos. 1-31)
- List of acts of the Legislative Council of Western Australia from 1879 (42 Vict. Nos. 32-33; 43 Vict.)

=== 1880-1889 ===
- List of acts of the Legislative Council of Western Australia from 1880 (44 Vict. Nos. 1-14)
- List of acts of the Legislative Council of Western Australia from 1881 (44 Vict. Nos. 15-23; 45 Vict.; 46 Vict. Nos. 1-3)
- List of acts of the Legislative Council of Western Australia from 1882 (46 Vict. Nos. 4-25)
- List of acts of the Legislative Council of Western Australia from 1883 (46 Vict. No. 26; 47 Vict.)
- List of acts of the Legislative Council of Western Australia from 1884 (48 Vict.)
- List of acts of the Legislative Council of Western Australia from 1885 (49 Vict.)
- List of acts of the Legislative Council of Western Australia from 1886 (50 Vict.)
- List of acts of the Legislative Council of Western Australia from 1887 (51 Vict. Nos. 1-21)
- List of acts of the Legislative Council of Western Australia from 1888 (51 Vict. Nos. 22-32; 52 Vict. Nos. 1-21)
- List of acts of the Legislative Council of Western Australia from 1889 (52 Vict. Nos. 22-24; 53 Vict.)

=== 1890-1899 ===
No acts were passed in 1890.

In 1891 the Constitution Act 1889 (52 Vict. No. 23) took effect: the Legislative Assembly joined the Legislative Council, and the Parliament of Western Australia was formed.

- List of acts of the Parliament of Western Australia from 1891 (54 Vict.)
- List of acts of the Parliament of Western Australia from 1892 (55 Vict.)
- List of acts of the Parliament of Western Australia from 1893 (56 Vict.; 57 Vict.)
- List of acts of the Parliament of Western Australia from 1894 (58 Vict.)
- List of acts of the Parliament of Western Australia from 1895 (59 Vict.)
- List of acts of the Parliament of Western Australia from 1896 (60 Vict. Nos. 1-44)
- List of acts of the Parliament of Western Australia from 1897 (60 Vict. Nos. 45-46; 61 Vict.)
- List of acts of the Parliament of Western Australia from 1898 (62 Vict.)
- List of acts of the Parliament of Western Australia from 1899 (63 Vict. Nos. 1-54)

== 20th century ==
=== 1900-1909 ===
- List of acts of the Parliament of Western Australia from 1900 (63 Vict. Nos. 55-56; 64 Vict.)

In 1901, Western Australia became a state within the new federal Commonwealth of Australia.

- List of acts of the Parliament of Western Australia from 1901 (1 Edw. VII)
- List of acts of the Parliament of Western Australia from 1902 (1 & 2 Edw. VII; 2 Edw. VII)
- List of acts of the Parliament of Western Australia from 1903
- List of acts of the Parliament of Western Australia from 1904
- List of acts of the Parliament of Western Australia from 1905
- List of acts of the Parliament of Western Australia from 1906
- List of acts of the Parliament of Western Australia from 1907
- List of acts of the Parliament of Western Australia from 1908
- List of acts of the Parliament of Western Australia from 1909

=== 1910-1919 ===
- List of acts of the Parliament of Western Australia from 1910
- List of acts of the Parliament of Western Australia from 1911
- List of acts of the Parliament of Western Australia from 1912
- List of acts of the Parliament of Western Australia from 1913
- List of acts of the Parliament of Western Australia from 1914
- List of acts of the Parliament of Western Australia from 1915
- List of acts of the Parliament of Western Australia from 1916
- List of acts of the Parliament of Western Australia from 1917
- List of acts of the Parliament of Western Australia from 1918
- List of acts of the Parliament of Western Australia from 1919

=== 1920-1929 ===
- List of acts of the Parliament of Western Australia from 1920
- List of acts of the Parliament of Western Australia from 1921
- List of acts of the Parliament of Western Australia from 1922
- List of acts of the Parliament of Western Australia from 1923
- List of acts of the Parliament of Western Australia from 1924
- List of acts of the Parliament of Western Australia from 1925
- List of acts of the Parliament of Western Australia from 1926
- List of acts of the Parliament of Western Australia from 1927
- List of acts of the Parliament of Western Australia from 1928
- List of acts of the Parliament of Western Australia from 1929

=== 1930-1939 ===
- List of acts of the Parliament of Western Australia from 1930
- List of acts of the Parliament of Western Australia from 1931
- List of acts of the Parliament of Western Australia from 1932
- List of acts of the Parliament of Western Australia from 1933
- List of acts of the Parliament of Western Australia from 1934
- List of acts of the Parliament of Western Australia from 1935
- List of acts of the Parliament of Western Australia from 1936
- List of acts of the Parliament of Western Australia from 1937
- List of acts of the Parliament of Western Australia from 1938
- List of acts of the Parliament of Western Australia from 1939

=== 1940-1949 ===
- List of acts of the Parliament of Western Australia from 1940
- List of acts of the Parliament of Western Australia from 1941
- List of acts of the Parliament of Western Australia from 1942
- List of acts of the Parliament of Western Australia from 1943
- List of acts of the Parliament of Western Australia from 1944
- List of acts of the Parliament of Western Australia from 1945
- List of acts of the Parliament of Western Australia from 1946
- List of acts of the Parliament of Western Australia from 1947
- List of acts of the Parliament of Western Australia from 1948
- List of acts of the Parliament of Western Australia from 1949

=== 1950-1959 ===
- List of acts of the Parliament of Western Australia from 1950
- List of acts of the Parliament of Western Australia from 1951
- List of acts of the Parliament of Western Australia from 1952
- List of acts of the Parliament of Western Australia from 1953
- List of acts of the Parliament of Western Australia from 1954
- List of acts of the Parliament of Western Australia from 1955
- List of acts of the Parliament of Western Australia from 1956
- List of acts of the Parliament of Western Australia from 1957
- List of acts of the Parliament of Western Australia from 1958
- List of acts of the Parliament of Western Australia from 1959

=== 1960-1969 ===
- List of acts of the Parliament of Western Australia from 1960
- List of acts of the Parliament of Western Australia from 1961
- List of acts of the Parliament of Western Australia from 1962
- List of acts of the Parliament of Western Australia from 1963
- List of acts of the Parliament of Western Australia from 1964
- List of acts of the Parliament of Western Australia from 1965
- List of acts of the Parliament of Western Australia from 1966
- List of acts of the Parliament of Western Australia from 1967
- List of acts of the Parliament of Western Australia from 1968
- List of acts of the Parliament of Western Australia from 1969

=== 1970-1979 ===
- List of acts of the Parliament of Western Australia from 1970
- List of acts of the Parliament of Western Australia from 1971
- List of acts of the Parliament of Western Australia from 1972
- List of acts of the Parliament of Western Australia from 1973
- List of acts of the Parliament of Western Australia from 1974
- List of acts of the Parliament of Western Australia from 1975
- List of acts of the Parliament of Western Australia from 1976
- List of acts of the Parliament of Western Australia from 1977
- List of acts of the Parliament of Western Australia from 1978
- List of acts of the Parliament of Western Australia from 1979

=== 1980-1989 ===
- List of acts of the Parliament of Western Australia from 1980
- List of acts of the Parliament of Western Australia from 1981
- List of acts of the Parliament of Western Australia from 1982
- List of acts of the Parliament of Western Australia from 1983
- List of acts of the Parliament of Western Australia from 1984
- List of acts of the Parliament of Western Australia from 1985
- List of acts of the Parliament of Western Australia from 1986
- List of acts of the Parliament of Western Australia from 1987
- List of acts of the Parliament of Western Australia from 1988
- List of acts of the Parliament of Western Australia from 1989

=== 1990-1999 ===
- List of acts of the Parliament of Western Australia from 1990
- List of acts of the Parliament of Western Australia from 1991
- List of acts of the Parliament of Western Australia from 1992
- List of acts of the Parliament of Western Australia from 1993
- List of acts of the Parliament of Western Australia from 1994
- List of acts of the Parliament of Western Australia from 1995
- List of acts of the Parliament of Western Australia from 1996
- List of acts of the Parliament of Western Australia from 1997
- List of acts of the Parliament of Western Australia from 1998
- List of acts of the Parliament of Western Australia from 1999

== 21st century ==
=== 2000-2009 ===
- List of acts of the Parliament of Western Australia from 2000
- List of acts of the Parliament of Western Australia from 2001
- List of acts of the Parliament of Western Australia from 2002
- List of acts of the Parliament of Western Australia from 2003
- List of acts of the Parliament of Western Australia from 2004
- List of acts of the Parliament of Western Australia from 2005
- List of acts of the Parliament of Western Australia from 2006
- List of acts of the Parliament of Western Australia from 2007
- List of acts of the Parliament of Western Australia from 2008
- List of acts of the Parliament of Western Australia from 2009

=== 2010-2019 ===
- List of acts of the Parliament of Western Australia from 2010
- List of acts of the Parliament of Western Australia from 2011
- List of acts of the Parliament of Western Australia from 2012
- List of acts of the Parliament of Western Australia from 2013
- List of acts of the Parliament of Western Australia from 2014
- List of acts of the Parliament of Western Australia from 2015
- List of acts of the Parliament of Western Australia from 2016
- List of acts of the Parliament of Western Australia from 2017
- List of acts of the Parliament of Western Australia from 2018
- List of acts of the Parliament of Western Australia from 2019

=== 2020- ===
- List of acts of the Parliament of Western Australia from 2020
- List of acts of the Parliament of Western Australia from 2021
- List of acts of the Parliament of Western Australia from 2022
- List of acts of the Parliament of Western Australia from 2023
- List of acts of the Parliament of Western Australia from 2024
- List of acts of the Parliament of Western Australia from 2025
- List of acts of the Parliament of Western Australia from 2026

== See also ==
- Legislative Council of Western Australia
- Parliament of Western Australia
