= List of acts of the Parliament of Western Australia from 1936 =

This is a list of acts of the Parliament of Western Australia for the year 1936.

== 1936 ==
Short title, or popular name	Citation	Royal assent
Long title
	No. 1 of 1936; 1 Edw. VIII. No. 1	25 August 1936
AN ACT to apply out of the Consolidated Revenue Fund the sum of One Million Three Hundred Thousand Pounds, and from Moneys to Credit of the General Loan Fund Six Hundred Thousand Pounds, to the Service of the Year ending 30th June, 1937, and to apply out of the Public Account the sum of Three Hundred Thousand Pounds for the purpose of temporary Advances to be made by the Treasurer.
Wool (Draft Allowance Prohibition) Act 1936	No. 2 of 1936; 1 Edw. VIII. No. 2	3 November 1936
An Act relating to certain deductions known as Draft Allowance in connection with the sale of Wool.
Cue–Big Bell Railway Act 1936	No. 5 of 1936; 1 Edw. VIII. No. 5	3 November 1936
An Act to authorise the construction of a railway from Cue to Big Bell and to ratify an agreement made the 6th day of March, 1936, between the Honourable the Premier, on behalf of the Crown, and the American Smelting and Refining Company of New Jersey.
	No. X of 1936	
Aborigines Act Amendment Act 1936	No. 43 of 1936; 1 Edw. VIII. No. 43	11 Dec 1936
An Act to amend the Aborigines Act, 1905. (Note: Aborigines Act 1905 (No. 14))

== Sources ==
- "legislation.wa.gov.au".
