= List of acts of the Parliament of Western Australia from 1939 =

This is a list of acts of the Parliament of Western Australia for the year 1939.

== 1939 ==
| Short title, or popular name | Citation | Royal assent |
Long title
| | No. 1 of 1939 | 6 September 1939 |
An Act to apply out of the Consolidated Revenue Fund the sum of One Million Seven Hundred and Fifty Thousand Pounds, and from Moneys to Credit of the General Loan Fund Four Hundred and Fifty Thousand Pounds, to the Service of the Year ending 30th June, 1940, and to apply out of the Public Account the sum of Three Hundred Thousand Pounds for the purpose of temporary Advances to be made by the Treasurer.
| Geraldton Harbour Works Railway Extension Act 1939 | No. 2 of 1939 | 5 October 1939 |
An Act to authorise the construction of a Railway to extend the Geraldton Harbour Works Railway to the industrial area of Geraldton.
| | No. X of 1939 | |
| Marketing of Eggs Act Amendment Act 1939 | No. 55 of 1939 | 23 December 1939 |
An Act to amend the Marketing of Eggs Act, 1938. (Note: Marketing of Eggs Act 1938 (No. 51))
| Road Districts Act Amendment Act 1939 | No. 56 of 1939 | 23 December 1939 |
An Act to amend paragraph (41) of Section two hundred and four of the Road Districts Act, 1919-1934. (Note: Road Districts Act 1919 (No. 38))

== Sources ==
- "legislation.wa.gov.au".
