= List of ordinances of the Legislative Council of Western Australia from 1838 =

This is a list of ordinances of the Legislative Council of Western Australia for the year 1838.

== 1838 ==
Short title, or popular name	Citation	Royal assent
Long title
	1 Vict. No. 1	15 June 1838
An Act to provide for the Appointment of Trustees of Church Property.
	1 Vict. No. 2	15 June 1838
An Act to provide for the Management of Roads, Streets, and other Internal Communications, within the Settlement of Western Australia.
	1 Vict. No. 3	15 June 1838
An Act to amend an Act, passed in the fifth year of the reign of His late Majesty William IV., intituled "An Act to regulate the Sale of Spirituous and Fermented Liquors by Retail." (Note: 5 Will. IV. No. 4)

== Sources ==
- "legislation.wa.gov.au".
