= List of acts of the Parliament of Western Australia from 1968 =

This is a list of acts of the Parliament of Western Australia for the year 1968.

== 1968 ==
Short title, or popular name	Citation	Royal assent
Long title
Supply Act 1968	No. 1 of 1968	16 August 1968
An Act to apply out of the Consolidated Revenue Fund the sum of One Hundred and Ten Million Dollars and from Moneys to Credit of the General Loan Fund Thirty Million Dollars, to the Service of the Year ending 30th June, 1969, and to apply out of the Public Account the Sum of Five Million Dollars for the purpose of temporary Advances to be made by the Treasurer.
Kwinana Loop Railway Act 1968	No. 39 of 1968	6 November 1968
An Act to Authorise the Construction of a Loop line of Railway extending from the Industrial Lands (Kwinana) Railway.
Mangles Bay Railway Act 1968	No. 40 of 1968	6 November 1968
An Act to Authorise the Construction of a Railway from the Kwinana Loop Railway to Mangles Bay.
	No. X of 1968	
Appropriation Act (Consolidated Revenue Fund) 1968-69	No. 70 of 1968	18 November 1968
An Act to appropriate and apply out of the Consolidated Revenue Fund and from the Public Account certain sums to make good the supplies granted for the service of the Year ending the 30th day of June, 1969, and to supplement grants made by the last Parliament during its third Session in adjustment of the Vote "Advance to Treasurer, 1967-68", for charges during the Year ended the 30th day of June, 1968; and to approve of certain expenditure under section forty-one of the Forests Act, 1918-1964. (Note: [Forests Act 1918]] (No. 8 of 1919))

== Sources ==
- "legislation.wa.gov.au".
