= List of ordinances of the Legislative Council of Western Australia from 1841 =

This is a list of ordinances of the Legislative Council of Western Australia for the year 1841.

== 1841 ==
Short title, or popular name	Citation	Royal assent
Long title
	4 & 5 Vict. No. 1	12 March 1841
An Act to revise, renew and amend An Act entitled "An Act to impose certain Duties on Imported Spirituous Liquors." (Note: 5 Will. IV. No. 3)
	4 & 5 Vict. No. 2	12 March 1841
An Act to renew and amend an Act entitled "An Act for the Regulation of the Customs of Western Australia." (Note: 2 Vict. No. 3)
	4 & 5 Vict. No. 3	12 March 1841
An Act to renew, and amend an Act (Note: 2 Vict. No. 4) entitled "An Act to amend an Act to Regulate the Sale of Spirituous and Fermented Liquors by Retail, and for the Issuing of certain Licenses connected therewith."
	4 & 5 Vict. No. 4	12 March 1841
An Act to continue for a limited time "An Act to enable the Inhabitants of any Township to assess themselves for the Improvement of the Town." (Note: 2 Vict. No. 5)
	4 & 5 Vict. No. 5	15 April 1841
An Ordinance to naturalize Johann August Ludwig Preiss.
	4 & 5 Vict. No. 6	15 April 1841
An Ordinance to naturalize Frederick Waldeck
	4 & 5 Vict. No. 7	3 May 1841
An Act to revive, renew, and continue for a limited period, an Act (Note: 2 Vict. No. 7) intituled "An Act to amend an Act (Note: 2 Will. IV. No. 9) for the Regulation of Pilotage and Shipping in the Harbours of Western Australia."
Public House Licensing Ordinance 1841	4 & 5 Vict. No. 8	14 May 1841
An Act for repealing the Laws now in force relative to the Licensing and regulating of Public Houses, and for the better regulating the granting of Licenses for the Sale of Ale, Beer, Wine, Spirits, and other Liquors in Western Australia in future.
	4 & 5 Vict. No. 9	27 May 1841
An Act to provide for the Registration of Births, Deaths, and Marriages, in the Colony of Western Australia.
	4 & 5 Vict. No. 10	27 May 1841
An Act to regulate the Solemnization of Matrimony in the Colony of Western Australia.
	4 & 5 Vict. No. 11	10 June 1841
An Act for applying certain Sums arising from the Revenue receivable in the Colony of Western Australia to the Service thereof, for the Financial Year commencing first April, one thousand eight hundred and forty-two. (Repealed by Statute Law Revision Act 1964 (13 Eliz. II. No. 61))
	4 & 5 Vict. No. 12	22 July 1841
An Ordinance to naturalize Benjamin Franklin Simmons.
Land Transfer Duty Act 1841	4 & 5 Vict. No. 13	29 July 1841
An Act to impose a Duty upon the Transfer of Landed Property.
	4 & 5 Vict. No. 14	29 July 1841
An Act to remove the annoyance occasioned by Dogs in the Colony of Western Australia.
	4 & 5 Vict. No. 15	3 August 1841
An Act for the regulation of Pilotage and Shipping in the Harbours of Western Australia. (Repealed by Shipping and Pilotage Consolidation Ordinance 1855 (18 Vict. No. 15))
	4 & 5 Vict. No. 16	23 September 1841
An Act to repeal certain Acts relating to the Management of Roads, Streets and other Internal Communications, and enabling the Inhabitants of Townships to assess themselves for the Improvement of the Town.
	4 & 5 Vict. No. 17	23 September 1841
An Act to provide for the Construction and Management of Roads and other Internal Communications in the Colony of Western Australia. (Repealed by 10 Vict. No. 19)
	4 & 5 Vict. No. 18	23 September 1841
An Act to provide for the improvement of Towns in the Colony of Western Australia.
	4 & 5 Vict. No. 19	30 September 1841
An Act to secure the repayment in certain cases of Expenses incurred by the Local Government for the introduction of Labonrers, Domestic Servants, Mechanics, and Artizans, into the Colony of Western Australia.
Land Boundaries Act 1841	4 & 5 Vict. No. 20	30 September 1841
An Act to provide for the more effectual and accurate establishment of the Boundaries of Land within the Colony of Western Australia.
	4 & 5 Vict. No. 21	26 November 1841
An Act to constitute the Island of Rottnest a Legal Prison.
	4 & 5 Vict. No. 22	26 November 1841
An Act to allow the Aboriginal Natives of Western Australia to give information and evidence without the sanction of an Oath.

== Sources ==
- "legislation.wa.gov.au".
