= List of acts of the Legislative Council of Western Australia from 1876 =

This is a list of acts of the Legislative Council of Western Australia for the year 1876.

== 1876 ==
Short title, or popular name	Citation	Royal assent
Long title
Trespass Act 1872 Amendment Act 1875	39 Vict. No. 19	3 January 1872
An Act to amend "The Trespass Act, 1872." (Note: Trespass Act 1872 (36 Vict. No. 9))
	39 Vict. No. 20	3 January 1872
An Act to amend the Law concerning the Remission of Penalties.
Railway Supplementary Loan Act 1875	39 Vict. No. 21	23 December 1876 (Note: Royal assent delayed as the act was reserved for approval by Her Majesty, rather than by the governor.)
An Act for raising the sum of Twenty-six Thousand Pounds (Note: £26,000 in 1876 is equivalent to A$4,000,000 in 2022.) by Loan for the completion of the Railway between Geraldton and Northampton.
	40 Vict. No. 1	14 August 1876
An Act to confirm the Expenditure for the services of the year One thousand eight hundred and seventy-five, beyond the grant for that year.
Prawn Fishing Act 1876	40 Vict. No. 2	14 August 1876
An Act to regulate Prawn Fishing
	40 Vict. No. 3	28 August 1876
An Act to prohibit the importation to, and use within the Colony of Western Australia, of certain Dangerous Matches. (Repealed by 41 Vict. No. 8)
Inquiries into Wrecks Ordinance 1864 Extension Act 1876	40 Vict. No. 4	28 August 1876
An Act to extend the application of 'The Inquiries into Wrecks Ordinance, 1861.' (Note: Inquiries into Wrecks Ordinance 1864 (28 Vict. No. 2))
Cart and Carriage Licensing Act 1876	40 Vict. No. 5	7 September 1876
An Act to consolidate and amend divers Acts and Ordinances relative to the licensing of Carts and Carriages.
Tariff Act 1876 (repealed)	40 Vict. No. 6	7 September 1876
An Act to repeal "The Tariff Act, 1872," (Note: Tariff Act 1872 (36 Vict. No. 4)) and to make other provision in lieu thereof. (Repealed by Tariff Act 1879 (43 Vict. No. 25))
Game Act 1874 Amendment Act 1876	40 Vict. No. 7	7 September 1876
An Act to amend and make perpetual "The Game Act, 1874." (Note: Game Act 1874 (38 Vict. No. 4))
High School Act 1876 renamed to Hale School Act 1876	40 Vict. No. 8	12 September 1876
An Act to make provision for the Higher Education of Boys.
Removal of Guano Act 1876	40 Vict. No. 9	12 September 1876
An Act to make further provision for the punishment of persons trespassing on certain portions of the Crown Lands in Western Australia.
	40 Vict. No. 10	12 September 1876
An Act to make provision for the punishment of Masters of Vessels in certain cases. (Repealed by 43 Vict. No. 21)
	40 Vict. No. 11	12 September 1876
An Act to repeal certain Ordinances relative to Slaughter-houses.
District Roads Act 1871 Amendment Act 1876	40 Vict. No. 12	12 September 1876
An Act to amend "The District Roads Act, 1871." (Note: District Roads Act 1871 (34 Vict. No. 26))
Municipal Institutions' Act 1876	40 Vict. No. 13	12 September 1876
An Act to amend "The Municipal Institutions Act, 1871," (Note: Municipal Institutions' Act 1871 (34 Vict. No. 6))
Imported Stock Act 1876	40 Vict. No. 14	12 September 1876
An Act to prevent the introduction of Contagious or Infectious Diseases in Cattle and Sheep.
	40 Vict. No. 15	13 September 1876
An Act to appropriate the sum of One Hundred and Fifty-three Thousand Two Hundred and Twenty-five Pounds Eighteen Shillings and Eightpence (Note: £153,225 18s 8d in 1876 is equivalent to A$23,800,000 in 2022.) out of the General Revenue of the Colony for the Service of the year One thousand eight hundred and seventy-seven.

== Sources ==
- "legislation.wa.gov.au".
