= List of ordinances of the Legislative Council of Western Australia from 1864 =

This is a list of ordinances of the Legislative Council of Western Australia for the year 1864.

== 1864 ==
Short title, or popular name	Citation	Royal assent
Long title
	28 Vict. No. 1	11 July 1864
An Ordinance to amend "The Post Office Savings Bank Ordinance." (Note: Post Office Savings Bank Ordinance 1863 (27 Vict. No. 5))
Inquiries into Wrecks Ordinance 1864	28 Vict. No. 2	11 July 1864
An Ordinance to establish Courts of Inquiry into the causes of Wrecks and. other casualties.
	28 Vict. No. 3	11 July 1864
An Ordinance for securing to Alfred Carson, for a limited period, the exclusive Benefit of a certain Invention.
	28 Vict. No. 4	11 July 1864
An Ordinance for protecting the Oyster Fisheries on the Coasts of this Colony.
	28 Vict. No. 5	11 July 1864
An Ordinance to amend "The Insolvent Ordinance, 1863." (Note: Insolvent Ordinance 1863 (27 Vict. No. 20))
	28 Vict. No. 6	11 July 1864
An Ordinance to amend "The Jury Ordinance, 1858." (Note: Jury Ordinance 1858 (22 Vict. No. 7))
	28 Vict. No. 7	11 July 1864
An Ordinance to rectify a Clerical error in the Ordinance entituled "An Ordinance to amend the Colonial Passengers Ordinance 1861." (Note: 27 Vict. No. 9)
	28 Vict. No. 8	11 July 1864
An Ordinance to confirm the Expenditure for the Services of the year 1863, beyond the grant for that year.
	28 Vict. No. 9	11 July 1864
An Ordinance for extending the limits of St. George's Terrace in the City of Perth, and for appropriating a portion of Spring Street in the same City.
City Council Amendment Ordinance 1864 (repealed)	28 Vict. No. 10	11 July 1864
An Ordinance to amend "The City of Perth Improvement Ordinance, 1858." (Note: City of Perth Improvement Ordinance 1858 (22 Vict. No. 10)) (Repealed by Municipal Institutions' Act 1871 (34 Vict. No. 6))
	28 Vict. No. 11	11 July 1864
An Ordinance to appropriate the sum of Seventy Four Thousand and Thirty Eight Pounds, (Note: £74,038 in 1864 is equivalent to A$11,300,000 in 2022.) out of the General Revenue of the Colony, for the service of the year One Thousand Eight Hundred and Sixty Five.
	28 Vict. No. 12	11 July 1864
An Ordinance to amend the "Police Ordnance, 1861." (Note: Police Ordnance 1861 (25 Vict. No. 15))
Branding Consolidation Ordinance 1864	28 Vict. No. 13	11 July 1864
An Ordinance to consolidate and amend the Laws to regulate the Branding of Live Stock.
	28 Vict. No. 14	11 July 1864
An Ordinance to amend "The Cattle Trespass Ordinance, 1857." (Note: Cattle Trespass Ordinance 1857 (21 Vict. No. 7))
	28 Vict. No. 15	11 July 1864
An Ordinance to provide Summary Redress in cases of minor Trespasses.

== Sources ==
- "legislation.wa.gov.au".
