= List of ordinances of the Legislative Council of Western Australia from 1843 =

This is a list of ordinances of the Legislative Council of Western Australia for the year 1843.

== 1843 ==
Short title, or popular name	Citation	Royal assent
Long title
	7 Vict. No. 1	6 July 1843
An Act to impose certain Duties on Imported Spirituous Liquors, and on Wine and Tobacco. (Repealed by 9 Vict. No. 7)
	7 Vict. No. 2	13 July 1843
An Act for the Licensing of Boats and Boatmen. (Repealed by 19 Vict. No. 15)
	7 Vict. No. 3	13 July 1843
An Act to make further provision for the regulating of Public Houses.
Freehold Estates Conveyancing Act 1843	7 Vict. No. 4	13 July 1843
An Act for rendering a Release as effectual for the Conveyance of Freehold Estates as a Lease and Release by the same parties.
	7 Vict. No. 5	20 July 1843
An Act to appoint certain places for the landing of goods within the limits of Towns not being Seaport Towns.
	7 Vict. No. 6	3 August 1843
An Act to amend an Act intituled "An Act for the relief of Insolvent Debtors not in custody." (Note: 6 Vict. No. 11)
	7 Vict. No. 7	3 August 1843
An Act to continue for a limited period an Act intituled "An Act to allow the Aboriginal Natives of Western Australia to give information and evidence without the sanction of an Oath." (Note: 4 & 5 Vict. No. 22)
	7 Vict. No. 8	3 August 1843
An Act for applying certain Sums arising from the Revenue receivable in the Colony of Western Australia to the service thereof, for the Financial Year commencing First of April, One thousand eight hundred and forty-four. (Repealed by Statute Law Revision Act 1964 (13 Eliz. II. No. 61))
Real Property Transfer Act Amendment Act 1843	7 Vict. No. 9	17 August 1843
An Act for the Quieting of Titles to Lands in this Colony by declaring valid certain Instruments and Transactions affecting the same.
	7 Vict. No. 10	17 August 1843
An Act to amend an Act intituled "An Act to provide for the Registration of Deeds, Wills, Judgments, and Conveyances affecting Real Property." (Note: 2 Will. IV. No. 6)

== Sources ==
- "legislation.wa.gov.au".
