= List of ordinances of the Legislative Council of Western Australia from 1863 =

This is a list of ordinances of the Legislative Council of Western Australia for the year 1863.

== 1863 ==
Short title, or popular name	Citation	Royal assent
Long title
	27 Vict. No. 1	1 July 1863
An Ordinance to amend the law respecting Inquiries in the nature of Coroners' Inquests.
	27 Vict. No. 2	1 July 1863
An Ordinance to enable the Denomination of Christians called Methodists to hold Lands, to raise Money on Security of such Lands, and for other Purposes.
	27 Vict. No. 3	1 July 1863
An Ordinance to amend an Ordinance intituled "An Ordinance to organize and establish a Volunteer Military Force in Western Australia." (Note: Volunteer Force Ordinance 1861 (25 Vict. No. 3))
	27 Vict. No. 4	1 July 1863
An Ordinance for securing to Edward J Crease for a limited Period, the exclusive Benefit of a certain Invention.
Post Office Savings Bank Ordinance 1863	27 Vict. No. 5	1 July 1863
An Ordinance to grant Facilities for depositing Small Savings at Interest, with the Security of the Government for Repayment thereof.
	27 Vict. No. 6	1 July 1863
An Ordinance to regulate Friendly Societies.
	27 Vict. No. 7	15 July 1863
An Ordinance for the regulation of Benefit Building Societies.
Steam Vessel Boat Ordinance 1863 (repealed)	27 Vict. No. 8	15 July 1863
An Ordinance to compel River Steam Vessels to carry a Boat. (Repealed by Boat Licensing Act 1878 (42 Vict. No. 24))
	27 Vict. No. 9	15 July 1863
An Ordinance to amend the "Colonial Passengers Ordinance, 1861." (Note: Colonial Passengers Ordinance 1861 (25 Vict. No. 9))
	27 Vict. No. 10	15 July 1863
An Ordinance for preventing Frauds upon Creditors by Secret Bills of Sale of Personal Chattels.
	27 Vict. No. 11	15 July 1863
An Ordinance for vesting all Estates and Property occupied by or for the Naval Service of the United Kingdom of Great Britain and Ireland, in the Lord High Admiral, or the Commissioners for executing the Office of Lord High Admiral, of the said United Kingdom, for the time being.
	27 Vict. No. 12	15 July 1863
An Ordinance to confirm the Expenditure for the Services of the Year 1862 beyond the Grant for that Year.
	27 Vict. No. 13	15 July 1863
An Ordinance for vesting certain Lands in the City of Perth in Her Majesty.
	27 Vict. No. 14	15 July 1863
An Ordinance to facilitate the sale of Colonial Wine.
	27 Vict. No. 15	15 July 1863
An Ordinance to appropriate and apply the sum of Seventy Thousand One Hundred and Forty Pounds (Note: £70,140 in 1863 is equivalent to A$10,100,000 in 2022.) out of the General Revenue of the Colony for the Service of the year One Thousand Eight Hundred and Sixty Four.
Vineyard Distillation Ordinance 1863	27 Vict. No. 16	15 July 1863
An Ordinance to encourage the Cultivation of the Vine by permitting Distillation of the produce thereof, under certain restrictions.
	27 Vict. No. 17	15 July 1863
An Ordinance to extend the Jurisdiction of the Police and Resident Magistrates.
	27 Vict. No. 18	15 July 1863
An Ordinance to regulate the Pensioners Benevolent Society. (Repealed by 35 Vict. No. 13)
Matrimonial Causes Ordinance 1863	27 Vict. No. 19	22 July 1863
An Ordinance to regulate Divorce and Matrimonial Causes.
Insolvent Ordinance 1863	27 Vict. No. 20	22 July 1863
An Ordinance to amend "The Insolvent Ordinance of 1856." (Note: Insolvent Ordinance 1856 (20 Vict. No. 10))
Small Debts Ordinance 1863	27 Vict. No. 21	22 July 1863
An Ordinance for the recovery of Small Debts and Demands.

== Sources ==
- "legislation.wa.gov.au".
