= List of acts of the Parliament of Western Australia from 1979 =

This is a list of acts of the Parliament of Western Australia for the year 1979.

== 1979 ==
Short title, or popular name	Citation	Royal assent
Long title
Essential Foodstuffs and Commodities Act 1979	No. X of 1979	4 April 1979
An Act to make provision to ensure the supply of essential foodstuffs and essential commodities.
Litter Act 1979	No. 81 of 1979	11 December 1979
An Act to make provision for the abatement of litter, to establish, incorporate and confer powers upon the Keep Australia Beautiful Council (W.A.), and for incidental and other purposes.
Armorial Bearings Protection Act 1979	No. 108 of 1979	17 December 1979
An Act to prohibit the unauthorised use of the Royal, State or other Arms and for other incidental purposes.
	No. X of 1979	
Liquor Act Amendment Act (No. 2) 1979	No. 119 of 1979	21 December 1979
An Act to amend section 51, section 55, section 59, section 59A, section 62, section 90 and section 166 of the Liquor Act, 1970-1978. (Note: Liquor Act 1970 (No. 34))

== Sources ==
- "legislation.wa.gov.au".
