= List of ordinances of the Legislative Council of Western Australia from 1840 =

This is a list of ordinances of the Legislative Council of Western Australia for the year 1840.

== 1840 ==
Short title, or popular name	Citation	Royal assent
Long title
	4 Vict. No. 1	2 July 1840
An Act to constitute the Island of Rottnest a Legal Prison.
	4 Vict. No. 2	2 July 1840
An Act to extend the Jurisdiction of Magistrates in Cases of Complaint between Masters and Servants.
	4 Vict. No. 3	8 July 1840
An Act for applying certain Sums arising from the Revenue receivable in the Colony of Western Australia to the Service thereof, for the Financial Year commencing 1st of April, One thousand eight hundred and forty-one, and for further appropriating the said Revenue. (Repealed by Statute Law Revision Act 1964 (13 Eliz. II. No. 61))
	4 Vict. No. 4	2 July 1840
An Act to provide more suitable remedies in case of Seamen deserting from the Merchant Service in this Colony.
	4 Vict. No. 5	2 July 1840
An Act to restrict to a certain extent the Amount of each Bill or Note respectively, to be issued under the provisions of an Act intituled "An Act to regulate the establishment of Banking Companies in the Colony of Western Australia; and to enable the Proprietors of such Companies to sue and be sued in the name of any of their Public Officers," (Note: 7 Will. IV. No. 3) and to repeal a certain Act heretofore passed for a similar purpose.
	4 Vict. No. 6	16 July 1840
An Act to promote the Building of Churches and Chapels, and to contribute towards the maintenance of Ministers of Religion in Western Australia.
	4 Vict. No. 7	2 July 1840
An Act to render illegal the Distillation of Ardent Spirits in this Colony, after the 18th March, 1841. (Repealed by 23 Vict. No. 11)
	4 Vict. No. 8	2 July 1840
An Act to allow the Aboriginal Natives of Western Australia to give information and evidence in Criminal cases, and to enable Magistrates to award summary punishment, for certain offences.

== Sources ==
- "legislation.wa.gov.au".
