= List of acts of the Parliament of Western Australia from 1997 =

This is a list of acts of the Parliament of Western Australia for the year 1985.

== 1997 ==
Short title, or popular name	Citation	Royal assent
Long title
Trustees Amendment Act 1997	No. 1 of 1985	6 May 1997
An Act to amend the—: Trustees Act 1962; (Note: Trustees Act 1962 (No. 78)) and; Trustee Companies Act 1987, (Note: Trustee Companies Act 1987 (No. 111)); and to make consequential amendments to other Acts.
Curriculum Council Act 1997 or the School Curriculum and Standards Authority Act 1997	No. X of 1985	8 July 1997
An Act to establish a council with functions relating to curriculum development and accreditation and certification of student achievement, to repeal the Secondary Education Authority Act 1984, (Note: Secondary Education Authority Act 1984 (No. 118)) and for related purposes.
	No. X of 1985	
Osteopaths Act 1997	No. 58 of 1985	15 December 1997
An Act to provide for the regulation of the practice of osteopathy and registration of persons as osteopaths, and for related purposes.

== Sources ==
- "legislation.wa.gov.au".
