= List of acts of the Legislative Council of Western Australia from 1879 =

This is a list of acts of the Legislative Council of Western Australia for the year 1879.

== 1879 ==
Short title, or popular name	Citation	Royal assent
Long title
Loan Act 1878 Amendment Act 1879	42 Vict. No. 32	16 January 1879
An Act to amend "The Loan Act, 1878." (Note: Loan Act 1878 (42 Vict. No. 22))
Western Australian Bank Act 1879	42 Vict. No. 33	7 April 1879 (Note: Royal assent delayed as the act was reserved for approval by Her Majesty, rather than by the governor.)
An Act to incorporate the Shareholders of 'The Western Australian Bank,' and for other purposes.
Public Officers Act 1879	43 Vict. No. 1	8 August 1879
An Act to regulate the appointment of certain Public Officers.
Fisheries (Dynamite) Act 1879	43 Vict. No. 2	8 August 1879
An Act to prohibit the use of Dynamite or other explosive substances for the purpose of catching or destroying Fish in Western Australia.
	43 Vict. No. 3	8 August 1879
An Act to amend "The Vendor and Purchaser Act, 1878." (Note: Vendor and Purchaser Act 1878 (42 Vict. No. 10))
	43 Vict. No. 4	8 August 1879
An Act to make additional provisions for Prison Discipline in Western Australia.
Foreign Probate Act 1879	43 Vict. No. 5	8 August 1879
An Act to give effect in Western Australia to Probates and Letters of Administration granted in any other part of Her Majesty's Dominions.
District Road Boards Audit Act 1879	43 Vict. No. 6	20 August 1879
An Act to provide for the preservation of the Funds of District Road Boards.
	43 Vict. No. 7	20 August 1879
An Act to further amend "The Customs Ordinance, 1860." (Note: Customs Ordinance 1860 (24 Vict. No. 5))
Bills of Exchange Act 1879	43 Vict. No. 8	26 August 1879
An Act to declare the law relating to the Acceptance of Bills of Exchange.
	43 Vict. No. 9	26 August 1879
An Act to amend the Ordinance (Note: 27 Vict. No. 19) to regulate Divorce and Matrimonial Causes.
Railways Amendment Act 1879	43 Vict. No. 10	26 August 1879
An Act to amend "The Railways Act, 1878" (Note: Railways Act 1878 (42 Vict. No. 31))
Real Estate Charges Amendment Act 1879	43 Vict. No. 11	2 September 1879
An Act to declare the application of the Acts relating to the Administration of the Estates of Deceased Persons.
Bankers' Books Evidence Act 1879	43 Vict. No. 12	2 September 1879
An Act to amend the Law with reference to Bankers' Books Evidence, and to limit the liability of Banks on Drafts or Orders payable to order.
	43 Vict. No. 13	2 September 1879
An Act to regulate the Forfeiture of Recognisances to keep the Peace and to obtain the Attendance of Prisoners as Witnesses in any Cause or Matter.
Poison Sale Act 1879	43 Vict. No. 14	3 September 1879
An Act to regulate the sale of Poisons.
Registration Ordinance Amendment Act 1879	43 Vict. No. 15	3 September 1879
An Act to amend The Registration Ordinance, (Note: Registration Ordinance 1856 (19 Vict. No. 12)) 19th Victoria, No. 12.
Scab Act 1879	43 Vict. No. 16	3 September 1879
An Act to amend and consolidate the Laws for preventing and exterminating the Scab in Sheep.
	43 Vict. No. 17	3 September 1879
An Act further to amend "The Transfer of Land Act, 1874." (Note: Transfer of Land Act 1874 (38 Vict. No. 13))
	43 Vict. No. 18	19 September 1879
An Act to amend "The Branding Consolidation Ordinance, 1864." (Note: Branding Consolidation Ordinance 1864 (28 Vict. No. 13))
Bills of Sale Act 1879	43 Vict. No. 19	19 September 1879
An Act to consolidate and amend the Law for preventing Frauds upon Creditors by Secret Bills of Sale of Personal Chattels.
Auctioneers' Amendment Act 1879	43 Vict. No. 20	19 September 1879
An Act to amend "The Auctioneers' Act, 1873." (Note: Auctioneers' Act 1873 (37 Vict. No. 8))
	43 Vict. No. 21	1 October 1879
An Act to repeal an Act (Note: 40 Vict. No. 10) to make provision for the Punishment of Masters of Vessels in certain cases.
	43 Vict. No. 22	1 October 1879
An Act to confirm the Expenditure for the services of the year One thousand eight hundred and seventy-eight, beyond the grant for that year.
	43 Vict. No. 23	1 October 1879
An Act for the prevention of the Importation of Diseased Stock.
	43 Vict. No. 24	1 October 1879
An Act to amend "The Absconding Debtors Act, (Note: Absconding Debtors Act 1877 (41 Vict. No. 17)) 41st Victoria, No. 17."
Tariff Act 1879	43 Vict. No. 25	7 October 1879
An Act to repeal "The Tariff Act, 1876," (Note: Tariff Act 1876 (40 Vict. No. 6)) and to make other provision in lieu thereof.
Wines, Beer, and Spirit Sale Act 1872 Amendment Act 1879	43 Vict. No. 26	8 October 1879
An Act to further amend "The Wines, Beer, and Spirit Sale Act, 1872." (Note: Wines, Beer, and Spirit Sale Act 1872 (36 Vict. No. 5))
	43 Vict. No. 27	8 October 1879
An Act to appropriate the sum of One Hundred and Seventy-six Thousand Two Hundred and Fifty-six Pounds Four Shillings and Eightpence (Note: £176,256 4s 8d in 1879 is equivalent to A$29,300,000 in 2022.) out of the General Revenue of the Colony for the Service of the year One thousand eight hundred and eighty.
Marriage Law Amendment Act 1879	43 Vict. No. 28	22 October 1879
An Act further to regulate the Celebration of Marriage in the Colony of Western Australia.

== Sources ==
- "legislation.wa.gov.au".
