= List of acts of the Parliament of Western Australia from 1937 =

This is a list of acts of the Parliament of Western Australia for the year 1937.

== 1937 ==
Short title, or popular name	Citation	Royal assent
Long title
	No. 1 of 1937	20 September 1937
An Act to apply out of the Consolidated Revenue Fund the sum of One Million Six Hundred Thousand Pounds, and from Moneys to Credit of the General Loan Fund Six Hundred Thousand Pounds, to the Service of the Year ending 30th June, 1938, and to apply out of the Public Account the sum of Three Hundred Thousand Pounds for the purpose of temporary Advances to be made by the Treasurer.
Federal Aid Roads (New Agreement Authorisation) Act Amendment Act 1937	No. 2 of 1937	13 September 1937
An Act to amend the Schedule to the Federal Aid Roads (New Agreement Authorisation) Act, 1936, (Note: Federal Aid Roads (New Agreement Authorisation) Act 1936 (No. 25)) and for other purposes relating thereto.
Anniversary of the Birthday of the Reigning Sovereign Act 1937	No. 9 of 1937	11 November 1937
An Act regarding the observance of the Anniversary of the Birthday of the reigning Sovereign.
	No. X of 1937	
Mining Act Amendment Act 1937	No. 56 of 1937	18 January 1938
An Act to further amend the Mining Act, 1904. (Note: [Mining Act 1904]] (No. 15))

== Sources ==
- "legislation.wa.gov.au".
