= List of ordinances of the Legislative Council of Western Australia from 1832 =

This is a list of ordinances of the Legislative Council of Western Australia for the year 1832.

== 1832 ==
Short title, or popular name	Citation	Royal assent
Long title
Civil Court of Western Australia Act 1832 (repealed)	2 Will. IV. No. 1	10 February 1832
An act for establishing a Court of Civil Judicature. (Repealed by Supreme Court Ordinance 1861 (24 Vict. No. 15))
	2 Will. IV. No. 2	17 February 1832
An act to provide a summary remedy for Trespasses committed by Cattle and other Live Stock. (Repealed by Cattle Trespass Ordinance 1857 (21 Vict. No. 7))
	2 Will. IV. No. 3	2 March 1832
An act for Regulating the Constitution of Juries; and the Office of Sheriff
Court of Quarter Sessions Act 1832 (repealed)	2 Will. IV. No. 4	2 March 1832
An Act to extend the Jurisdiction and Regulate the Proceedings of the Court of Quarter Sessions. (Repealed by Supreme Court Ordinance 1861 (24 Vict. No. 15))
	2 Will. IV. No. 5	6 March 1832
An Act to secure the Payment of Debts due to the Crown.
	2 Will. IV. No. 6	6 March 1832
An Act to provide for the Registration of Deeds, Wills, Judgments, and Conveyances affecting real property.
Real Property Transfer Act 1832	2 Will. IV. No. 7	2 March 1832
An Act to facilitate and simplify the Transfer of Real Property.
	2 Will. IV. No. 8	8 May 1832
An Act to regulate the Sale of Spirituous and Fermented Liquors by Retail.
	2 Will. IV. No. 9	11 May 1832
An Act for the Regulation of Pilotage and Shipping in the Harbours of Western Australia. (Repealed by Shipping and Pilotage Consolidation Ordinance 1855 (18 Vict. No. 15))
	2 Will. IV. No. 10	9 June 1832
An Act to impose certain Duties on Imported Spirituous Liquors.

== Sources ==
- "legislation.wa.gov.au".
