= List of ordinances of the Legislative Council of Western Australia from 1860 =

This is a list of ordinances of the Legislative Council of Western Australia for the year 1860.

== 1860 ==
Short title, or popular name	Citation	Royal assent
Long title
	23 Vict. No. 13	29 February 1860
An Ordinance to prevent Doubts as to the Legality of the "Jurors Book" for the current Year of 1860.
	23 Vict. No. 14	29 February 1860
An Ordinance to naturalize John Perejuan.
	24 Vict. No. 1	1 October 1860
An Ordinance to amend the Ordinance 19th Victoria, No. 8, of 1856, (Note: 19 Vict. No. 8) to substitute in certain cases other Punishment in lieu of Transportation.
	24 Vict. No. 2	5 October 1860
An Ordinance for the further Appropriation of the Revenue for the Year 1859, and for the general Appropriation of the Revenue for the Year 1861.
Real Property Transfer Act Amendment Ordinance 1860	24 Vict. No. 3	5 October 1860
An Ordinance to explain and extend an Ordinance, intituled "An Act for the Quieting of Titles to Lands in this Colony by declaring valid certain Instruments and Transactions affecting the same." (Note: Real Property Transfer Act Amendment Act 1843 (7 Vict. No. 9))
	24 Vict. No. 4	5 October 1860
An Ordinance to amend an Ordinance intituled "An Ordinance to regulate the temporal Affairs of Churches and Chapels of the United Church of England and Ireland in Western Australia." (Note: 16 Vict. No. 22) (Repealed by 37 Vict. No. 16)
Customs Ordinance 1860	24 Vict. No. 5	28 November 1860
An Ordinance to amend the Laws of the Customs in Western Australia.
Duty on Sandalwood Ordinance 1860	24 Vict. No. 6	28 November 1860
An Ordinance to impose an Export Duty on Sandal Wood.
Pawnbrokers' Ordinance 1860	24 Vict. No. 7	28 November 1860
An Ordinance for regulating the Trade or Business of Pawnbrokers in Western Australia.
	24 Vict. No. 8	28 November 1860
An Ordinance to amend "An Ordinance to consolidate and amend the Laws relating to Trespasses by live Stock and to promote the Construction of Fences." (Note: Cattle Trespass Ordinance 1857 (21 Vict. No. 7))
	24 Vict. No. 9	28 November 1860
An Ordinance to amend "An Ordinance to consolidate and amend the Laws respecting the Licensing of Boats and Boatmen." (Note: 19 Vict. No. 15) (Repealed by Boat Licensing Act 1878 (42 Vict. No. 24))
	24 Vict. No. 10	28 November 1860
An Ordinance to make better Provision for the Punishment of Frauds committed by Trustees, Bankers, and other Persons entrusted with Property.
	24 Vict. No. 11	5 December 1860
An Ordinance to make compulsory the Practice of Vaccination.
	24 Vict. No. 12	12 December 1860
An Ordinance to prohibit Aliens and Foreigners taking Whales and other Fish in the Waters of Western Australia.
	24 Vict. No. 13	12 December 1860
An Ordinance to naturalize the Very Reverend Raphael Martelli, the Reverend Francis Salvadó, the Reverend Ildephonsus Bertran, and the Reverend Emilian Coll.
	24 Vict. No. 14	12 December 1860
An Ordinance to provide for the Extension of the Boundaries of the Town of Newcastle.

== Sources ==
- "legislation.wa.gov.au".
