= List of acts of the Legislative Council of Western Australia from 1882 =

This is a list of acts of the Legislative Council of Western Australia for the year 1882.

== 1882 ==
Short title, or popular name	Citation	Royal assent
Long title
	36 Vict. No. 4	24 August 1882
An Act to provide for the Payment of certain additional and unforeseen Expenses in the year One thousand eight hundred and eighty-two, over and above the Estimates for that year.
Tariff Act 1882	46 Vict. No. 5	
Stamp Act 1882	46 Vict. No. 6	
Cattle Trespass, Fencing, and Impounding Act 1882	46 Vict. No. 7	
Poor Houses Discipline Act 1882	46 Vict. No. 8	
Customs Ordinance Interpretation Act 1882	46 Vict. No. 9	
Hawkers Act 1882	46 Vict. No. 10	
Masters and Servants Amendment Act 1882	46 Vict. No. 11	
Jury Amendment Act 1882	46 Vict. No. 12	
	46 Vict. No. 13	
	46 Vict. No. 14	
Scab Act 1882	46 Vict. No. 15	
Eastern Railway (Further) Amendment Act 1882	46 Vict. No. 16	21 September 1882
An Act to authorise the Further Extension of the Eastern Railway.
Railways Amendment Act 1882	46 Vict. No. 17	
Brands Act 1881 Amendment Act 1882	46 Vict. No. 18	
Municipal Institutions Further Amendment Act 1882	46 Vict. No. 19	
Industrial Schools Act Amendment Act 1882	46 Vict. No. 20	
Imported Labor Registry Act 1882 (Note: The spelling 'Labor' is used in this act; it was popular in Australian English during this time.)	46 Vict. No. 21	21 September 1882
An Act to provide for the Registration of certain Persons who shall be imported into Western Australia or employed in any manner within the Territorial Dominion thereof.
Loan Act 1882	46 Vict. No. 22	
	46 Vict. No. 23	23 September 1882
An Act to appropriate the sum of One Hundred and Eighty-six Thousand Two Hundred and Four Pounds and Eightpence out of the General Revenue of the Colony for such Services as shall come in course of payment during the year One thousand eight hundred and eighty-three
Legislative Council Act Amendment Act 1882	46 Vict. No. 24	24 February 1883 (Note: Royal assent delayed as the act was reserved for approval by Her Majesty, rather than by the governor.)
An Act to increase the number of Members to serve in the Legislative Council.
Loan Control Act 1882	46 Vict. No. 25	24 February 1883
An Act to provide for the more effectual Control of all Monies raised by Loan for Public Works purposes.

== Sources ==
- "legislation.wa.gov.au".
