= List of acts of the Parliament of Western Australia from 1945 =

This is a list of acts of the Parliament of Western Australia for the year 1945.

== 1945 ==
Short title, or popular name	Citation	Royal assent
Long title
	No. 1 of 1945; 9 Geo. VI. No. 1	27 August 1945
An Act to apply out of the Consolidated Revenue Fund the sum of Two Million Two Hundred Thousand Pounds, and from Moneys to Credit of the General Loan Fund Two Hundred Thousand Pounds, to the Service of the Year ending 30th June, 1946, and to apply out of the Public Account the sum of Three Hundred Thousand Pounds for the purpose of temporary Advances to be made by the Treasurer.
Mines Regulation Act Amendment Act 1945	No. 2 of 1945; 9 Geo. VI. No. 2	18 October 1945
An Act to amend the Mines Regulation Act, 1906-1938. (Note: Mines Regulation Act 1906 (No. 36))
Electricity Act 1945	No. 19 of 1945; 9 & 10 Geo. VI. No. 19	9 January 1946
An Act to consolidate and amend the law relating to the establishment and control of electricity generating stations and to the transmission, distribution and use of electricity; to repeal the Electricity Act, 1937; (Note: Electricity Act 1937 (No. 45)) and for other relative purposes.
South-West State Power Scheme Act 1945	No. 56 of 1945; 9 & 10 Geo. VI. No. 56	5 February 1946
An Act to approve of the Report of the Electricity Advisory Committee on the South-West National Power Scheme; to adopt the recommendations made therein by the said Committee; to authorise the carrying into execution of the said scheme in accordance with the provisions of the said report and the said recommendations; to authorise the acquisition of the undertaking of The Collie Power Company, Limited, and the incorporation thereof in the said scheme as an integral part thereof; and for other relative purposes.
	No. X of 1945	
State Electricity Commission Act 1945	No. 60 of 1945; 9 & 10 Geo. VI. No. 60	14 February 1946
An Act to constitute and regulate and confer powers and impose obligations upon a State Electricity Commission to undertake on behalf of His Majesty the establishment, maintenance and management and acquisition of Works for the manufacture, generation, transmission, distribution, supply and sale of electricity and other heating, lighting and motive power throughout or in any portions of the State; to take the place of the Commissioner of Railways in relation to the possession, control and management of the electric works already established under the Government Electric Works Act, 1914; (Note: Government Electric Works Act 1914 (No. 29 of 1915)) to repeal certain Acts; to provide for the transfer of certain assets, liabilities and obligations from the said Commissioner to the said Commission; and for other Purposes consequent thereon or incidental thereto.

== Sources ==
- "legislation.wa.gov.au".
