= List of acts of the Parliament of Western Australia from 1927 =

This is a list of acts of the Parliament of Western Australia for the year 1927.

== 1927 ==
Short title, or popular name	Citation	Royal assent
Long title
	No. 1 of 1927	19 August 1927
An Act to apply out of the Consolidated Revenue Fund the sum of Eight Hundred and Fifty Thousand Pounds, and from Moneys to Credit of the General Loan Fund Seven Hundred and Fifty Thousand Pounds, and from Moneys to Credit of the Government Property Sales Fund Ten Thousand Five Hundred Pounds, and from Moneys to Credit of the Land Improvement Loan Fund Three Thousand Pounds to the Service of the Year ending 30th June, 1928, and to apply out of the Public Account the sum of Three Hundred Thousand Pounds for the purposes of temporary Advances to be made by the Treasurer.
	No. 2 of 1927	29 September 1927
An Act to apply out of the Consolidated Revenue Fund the sum of Four Hundred and Fifty Thousand Pounds, and from Moneys to Credit of the General Loan Fund Three Hundred and Seventy-five Thousand Pounds, and from Moneys to Credit of the Government Property Sales Fund Five Thousand Pounds, and from Moneys to Credit of the Land Improvement Loan Fund One. Thousand Pounds to the Service of the Year ending 30th June, 1928.
Northam Municipal Ice Works Act Amendment Act 1927	No. 3 of 1927	3 October 1927
An Act to amend the Northam Municipal Ice Works Act, 1921. (Note: Northam Municipal Ice Works Act 1921 (No. 12))
Leighton–Robb's Jetty Railway Act 1927	No. 26 of 1927	23 December 1927
An Act to authorise the Construction of a Railway from Leighton to Robb's Jetty, with a Branch to Fremantle.
Meekatharra–Wiluna Railway Act 1927	No. 32 of 1927	23 December 1927
An Act to authorise the Construction of a Railway from Meekatharra to Wiluna.
	No. X of 1927	
Workers' Compensation Act Amendment Act 1927	No. 34 of 1927	28 December 1927
An Act to amend Section seven of the Workers' Compensation Act, 1912-1924, (Note: Workers' Compensation Act 1912 (No. 69)) and paragraph (c) in the proviso to Section one of the First Schedule thereto, and Section fourteen of the said Schedule.

== Sources ==
- "legislation.wa.gov.au".
