= List of acts of the Legislative Council of Western Australia from 1884 =

This is a list of acts of the Legislative Council of Western Australia for the year 1884.

== 1884 ==
Short title, or popular name	Citation	Royal assent
Long title
	48 Vict. No. 1	15 August 1884
An Act to confirm the Expenditure for the services of the year One thousand eight hundred and eighty-three, beyond the grants for that year.
	48 Vict. No. 2	
Land Quarantine Act 1884	48 Vict. No. 3	
General Loan and Inscribed Stock Act 1884	48 Vict. No. 4	
Regulation of Whipping Act 1884	48 Vict. No. 5	
Naval Deserters Act 1884	48 Vict. No. 6	
Designs and Trade Marks Act 1884	48 Vict. No. 7	
Customs Ordinance Amendment Act 1884	48 Vict. No. 8	
Bank Holidays Act 1884	48 Vict. No. 9	
Bills of Exchange Act 1884	48 Vict. No. 10	
	48 Vict. No. 11	
Newspaper Libel and Registration Act 1884	48 Vict. No. 12	
Amendment of Deeds of Grant Act 1884	48 Vict. No. 13	
Wines, Beer, and Spirit Sale Amendment Act 1884	48 Vict. No. 14	
Building Act 1884	48 Vict. No. 15	
	48 Vict. No. 16	
Albany Mechanics Institute Land Act 1884	48 Vict. No. 17	
	48 Vict. No. 18	
	48 Vict. No. 19	
Presbyterian Church Act 1884	48 Vict. No. 20	
Beverley–Albany Railway Act 1884	48 Vict. No. 21	13 September 1884
An Act to authorise the Construction of a Railway from Beverley to Albany, on the Land Grant System.
	48 Vict. No. 22	
	48 Vict. No. 23	
	48 Vict. No. 24	
Imported Labor Registry Act 1884	48 Vict. No. 25	
Loan Act 1884	48 Vict. No. 26	20 May 1885 (Note: Royal assent delayed as the act was reserved for approval by Her Majesty, rather than by the governor.)
An Act for raising the sum of Five Hundred and Twentyfive Thousand Pounds by Loan for the construction of certain Public Works.

== Sources ==
- "legislation.wa.gov.au".
