= List of acts of the Legislative Council of Western Australia from 1880 =

This is a list of acts of the Legislative Council of Western Australia for the year 1880.

== 1880 ==
Short title, or popular name	Citation	Royal assent
Long title
Shipwrecked Colonial Seamen's Act 1880	44 Vict. No. 1	28 July 1880
An Act to provide for the relief and return be Western Australia of Shipwrecked Colonial Seamen.
Census Act 1880	44 Vict. No. 2	28 July 1880
An Act to make perpetual an Ordinance intituled "An Ordinance for taking an account of the Population and of the amount of Live Stock and Crop and other Particulars of the Colony of Western Australia." (Note: 12 Vict. No. 4)
	44 Vict. No. 3	6 August 1880
An Act to amend "The Police Ordinance, 1861." (Note: Police Ordinance 1861 (25 Vict. No. 15))
	44 Vict. No. 4	6 August 1880
An Act to repeal certain portions of "The Public Officers Act, 1879" (Note: Public Officers Act 1879 (43 Vict. No. 1)) (43 Vic., No. 1).
Destructive Insects and Substances Act 1880	44 Vict. No. 5	6 September 1880
An Act for preventing the introduction of Insects or of Matter destructive to Vegetation.
	44 Vict. No. 6	6 September 1880
An Act to amend "The District Roads Act, 1871" (Note: District Roads Act 1871 (34 Vict. No. 26)) (34 Vic., No. 26).
Jury Act (Amendment) 1880	44 Vict. No. 7	6 September 1880
An Act to amend 'The Jury Act, 1871.' (Note: Jury Act 1871 (35 Vict. No. 8))
	44 Vict. No. 8	6 September 1880
An Act to amend "The Scab Act, 1879" (Note: Scab Act 1879 (43 Vict. No. 16)) (43rd Vict., No. 16).
Wines, Beer, and Spirit Sale Act 1880	44 Vict. No. 9	6 September 1880
An Act to Consolidate and Amend the Laws relating to the Licensing of Public Houses and the Sale of Fermented and Spirituous Liquors.
Supreme Court Act 1880	44 Vict. No. 10	7 September 1880
An Act to make provision for the better Administration of Justice in the Supreme Court of Western Australia.
Municipal Institutions Further Amendment Act 1880	44 Vict. No. 11	8 September 1880
An Act further to amend "The Municipal Institutions Act, 1876."
Perth Working Men's Association Mortgage Act 1880	44 Vict. No. 12	8 September 1880
An Act to enable the Perth Working Men's Association to raise Money on Mortgage.
	44 Vict. No. 13	8 September 1880
An Act to appropriate the sum of One Hundred and Sixty-eight Thousand Eight Hundred and Ninety-four Pounds Thirteen Shillings and Tenpence (Note: £168,894 13s 10d in 1880 is equivalent to A$27,400,000 in 2022.) out of the General Revenue of the Colony for the Service of the year One thousand eight hundred and eighty-one.
	44 Vict. No. 14	8 September 1880
An Act to appropriate the sum of Four Thousand and Twenty-five Pounds Two Shillings and Sixpence, (Note: £4,025 2s 6d in 1880 is equivalent to A$653,000 in 2022.) in addition to the sum of One Hundred and Seventy-six Thousand Two Hundred and Fifty-six Pounds Four Shillings and Eightpence, (Note: £176,256 4s 8d in 1880 is equivalent to A$57,200,000 in 2022.) out of the General Revenue of the Colony for the Service of the year One thousand eight hundred and eighty.

== Sources ==
- "legislation.wa.gov.au".
