= List of ordinances of the Legislative Council of Western Australia from 1853 =

This is a list of ordinances of the Legislative Council of Western Australia for the year 1853.

== 1853 ==
Short title, or popular name	Citation	Royal assent
Long title
Shortening Ordinance 1853	16 Vict. No. 11	13 April 1853
An Ordinance to interpret and shorten the Language of Ordinances of the Governor and Legislative Council, and to render unnecessary repetitions therein.
Public Slaughter House Ordinance Amendment 1853	16 Vict. No. 12	13 April 1853
An Ordinance to amend the "Public Slaughter House Ordinance, 1852." (Note: Public Slaughter House Ordinance 1852 (16 Vict. No. 10))
	16 Vict. No. 13	14 April 1853
An Ordinance to prohibit Sales by Auction carried on at night.
Kangaroo Ordinance 1853 (repealed)	16 Vict. No. 14	13 April 1853
An Ordinance to provide for the issue of Licenses to kill Kangaroos. (Repealed by 42 Vict. No. 9)
	16 Vict. No. 15	14 April 1853
An Ordinance to amend an Ordinance to provide for the establishment of a Scale of Pilotage fees and Light Dues passed in 1850, No. 2. (Note: 14 Vict. No. 2) (Repealed by Boat Licensing Act 1878 (42 Vict. No. 24))
Town Boundary Marks Ordinance 1853	16 Vict. No. 16	15 April 1853
An Ordinance to provide for the Removal of Boundary Posts in Towns, and for the substitution, under certain circumstances, of other Boundary Marks.
	16 Vict. No. 17	15 April 1853
An Ordinance to enable Trustees to Surrender and Exchange certain Lands vested in them for public purposes.
	16 Vict. No. 18	19 April 1853
An Ordinance to make further provision for the due Custody and Discipline of Offenders transported to Western Australia and Offenders sentenced therein to Transportation.
	16 Vict. No. 19	19 April 1853
An Ordinance to authorise Justices of the Peace to issue Search Warrants without Information on Oath, and to enact additional Police Regulations. (Repealed by Police Ordinance 1861 (25 Vict. No. 15))
	16 Vict. No. 20	20 April 1853
An Ordinance to make further provision for the Licensing of Boats and Boatmen, and for the preservation of Jetties, &c. (Repealed by 19 Vict. No. 15)
	16 Vict. No. 21	29 April 1853
An Ordinance to provide for the payment of certain unforeseen Expenses during the year 1853, and also for the appropriation of the Revenue for the year 1854. (Repealed by Statute Law Revision Act 1964 (13 Eliz. II. No. 61))
	16 Vict. No. 22	29 April 1853
An Ordinance to regulate the temporal affairs of Churches and Chapels of the United Church of England and Ireland, in Western Australia. (Repealed by 37 Vict. No. 16)
	16 Vict. No. 23	5 May 1853
An Ordinance to provide for the payment of certain unforeseen Expenses during the Year One Thousand Eight Hundred and Fifty-three. (Repealed by Statute Law Revision Act 1964 (13 Eliz. II. No. 61))

== Sources ==
- "legislation.wa.gov.au".
