= List of ordinances of the Legislative Council of Western Australia from 1834 =

This is a list of ordinances of the Legislative Council of Western Australia for the year 1834.

== 1834 ==
Short title, or popular name	Citation	Royal assent
Long title
	4 Will. IV. No. 1	7 January 1834
An Act to Regulate the Establishment and Management of Ferries; and the Collection of Tolls thereat.
	4 Will. IV. No. 4	7 April 1834
An Act to regulate the Fencing of Town and Suburban Allotments.
	4 Will. IV. No. 5	11 April 1834
An Act to amend an Act intituled "An act to provide a summary remedy for Trespasses committed by Cattle and other Live Stock." (Note: 2 Will. IV. No. 2) (Repealed by Cattle Trespass Ordinance 1857 (21 Vict. No. 7))
	5 Will. IV. No. 1	27 June 1834
An Act to continue until the thirtieth day of September next an Act of the Governor, with the Advice of the Legislative Council, intituled "An Act to impose certain Duties on Imported Spirituous Liquors." (Note: 2 Will. IV. No. 10)
	5 Will. IV. No. 2	25 August 1834
An Act to amend certain Acts of the Governor, with the Advice of the Legislative Council, so far as the same relate to the mode of appointment, and tenure of Office, of certain Officers thereby respectively constituted.
	5 Will. IV. No. 3	26 September 1834
An Act to impose certain Duties on Imported Spirituous Liquors.
	5 Will. IV. No. 4	31 September 1834
An Act to regulate the Sale of Spirituous and Fermented Liquors by Retail.
	5 Will. IV. No. 5	31 December 1834
An Act to regulate the Postage of Letters in the Colony of Western Australia.

== Sources ==
- "legislation.wa.gov.au".
