= List of ordinances of the Legislative Council of Western Australia from 1868 =

This is a list of ordinances of the Legislative Council of Western Australia for the year 1868.

== 1868 ==
Short title, or popular name	Citation	Royal assent
Long title
	32 Vict. No. 1	3 August 1868
An Ordinance to amend an Ordinance (Note: Escheat Ordinance 1867 (31 Vict. No. 3)) to declare the Law and Practice in cases of Escheat.
	32 Vict. No. 2	3 August 1868
An Ordinance to amend the Laws relating to Trespasses by Live Stock.
	32 Vict. No. 3	3 August 1868
An Ordinance for securing to Prosper Vincent Ramel for a limited period, the exclusive benefit of a certain Invention.
	32 Vict. No. 4	3 August 1868
An Ordinance for securing to Samuel Golay, for a limited period, the exclusive benefit of a certain Invention.
	32 Vict. No. 5	3 August 1868
An Ordinance to enable the Trustees of the town of Fremantle to assess the Inhabitants by a rental value. (Repealed by Municipal Institutions' Act 1871 (34 Vict. No. 6))
Fremantle Carriage Ordinance 1868	32 Vict. No. 6	3 August 1868
An Ordinance for Licencing Carriages in the Town of Fremantle.
	32 Vict. No. 7	3 August 1868
An Ordinance to vest in Her Majesty a certain piece of ground forming a portion of a public thoroughfare known by the name of Spencer Street in the Town of Albany.
Masters and Servants Amendment Ordinance 1868	32 Vict. No. 8	3 August 1868
An Ordinance further to provide summary remedy between Masters and Servants.
	32 Vict. No. 9	3 August 1868
An Ordinance to make better Provision for the Suppression of Violent Crimes committed by Convicts.
	32 Vict. No. 10	5 August 1868
An Ordinance for the better security of the Crown and Government.
	32 Vict. No. 11	7 August 1868
An Ordinance to Supplement the Governor's Salary.
Quarantine Ordinance 1868	32 Vict. No. 12	7 August 1868
An Ordinance to repeal the Laws relating to Quarantine, and to make other provisions in lieu thereof.
	32 Vict. No. 13	7 August 1868
An Ordinance to confirm the Expenditure for the services of the year One thousand. eight hundred and sixty-seven, beyond the grant for that year.
	32 Vict. No. 14	11 August 1868
An Ordinance to amend the "Colonial Passengers Ordinance 1861." (Note: Colonial Passengers Ordinance 1861 (25 Vict. No. 9))
	32 Vict. No. 15	11 August 1868
An Ordinance to appropriate the sum of Ninety Six Thousand Two Hundred and Seventy Six Pounds (Note: £96,276 in 1868 is equivalent to A$14,900,000 in 2022.) out of the General Revenue of the Colony, for the Service of the year one thousand eight hundred and sixty-nine.

== Sources ==
- "legislation.wa.gov.au".
