= List of acts of the Parliament of Western Australia from 1935 =

This is a list of acts of the Parliament of Western Australia for the year 1935.

== 1935 ==
Short title, or popular name	Citation	Royal assent
Long title
	No. 1 of 1935	27 August 1935
An Act to apply out of the Consolidated Revenue Fund the sum of One Million Three Hundred Thousand Pounds, and from Moneys to Credit of the General Loan Fund Six Hundred Thousand Pounds, to the Service of the Year ending 30th June, 1936, and to apply out of the Public Account the sum of Three Hundred Thousand Pounds for the purpose of temporary Advances to be made by the Treasurer.
Bunbury Racecourse Railway Discontinuance Act 1935	No. 2 of 1935	17 September 1935
An Act to authorise the discontinuance of the operation of the Bunbury Racecourse Railway, and for other purposes relating thereto.
St George's Court Act 1935	No. 25 of 1935	23 December 1935
An Act to divest certain lands from the registered proprietors thereof and to make provision for vesting the same in the City of Perth for the purpose of a street and public highway, and for other purposes incidental thereto.
Adelphi Hotel Act 1935	No. 26 of 1935	23 December 1935
An Act to extend the time for making application for a Publican's General License under the Licensing Act, 1911, (Note: Licensing Act 1911 (No. 32)) in respect of certain premises in course of erection and to be known as the Ade1phi Hotel, and to amend certain conditions of the provisional certificate relating thereto.
	No. X of 1935	
Bulk Handling Act 1935	No. 40 of 1935	7 January 1936
An Act relating to the Bulk Handling of Wheat by Co-operative Bulk Handling, Limited.

== Sources ==
- "legislation.wa.gov.au".
