= List of acts of the Parliament of Western Australia from 1891 =

This is a list of acts of the Parliament of Western Australia for the year 1891.

== 1891 ==
Short title, or popular name	Citation	Royal assent
Long title
	54 Vict. No. 1	23 January 1891
An Act to apply out of the Consolidated Revenue Fund the sum of Sixty Thousand Pounds (Note: £60,000 in 1891 is equivalent to A$9,400,000 in 2022.) to the Service of the Year 1891.
	54 Vict. No. 2	26 February 1891
An Act to apply a sum out of the Consolidated Revenue to the Service of the year ending the last day of December, One thousand eight hundred and ninety-one, and to appropriate the Supplies granted in this Session of Parliament.
Parliamentary Papers Act 1891	54 Vict. No. 3	26 February 1891
An Act to give protection to persons employed in the Printing and Publication of Papers by order or authority of the Legislative Council or Legislative Assembly or a Committee thereof respectively, and to facilitate the proof of Acts of Parliament and Parliamentary Papers.
Parliamentary Privileges Act 1891	54 Vict. No. 4	26 February 1891
An Act for defining the Privileges, Immunities, and Powers of the Legislative Council and Legislative Assembly of Western Australia, respectively.
Postage Stamp Act 1889 Amendment Act 1891	54 Vict. No. 5	26 February 1891
An Act to amend " The Postage Stamp Act, 1889." (Note: Postage Stamp Act 1889 (53 Vict. No. 19))
Officials in Parliament Act 1891	54 Vict. No. 6	26 February 1891
An Act to amend the Law relating to Persons accepting Office under the Crown who may retain their Seats in the Legislative Council and Legislative Assembly.
Census Act 1891	54 Vict. No. 7	26 February 1891
An Act for taking the Census of Western Australia in the year 1891, and thereafter.
Apportionment Act 1891	54 Vict. No. 8	26 February 1891
An Act for the better Apportionment of Rents and other Periodical Payments.
Loan Act 1891	54 Vict. No. 9	26 February 1891
An Act to authorise the raising of a sum of One Million Three Hundred and Thirty-six Thousand Pounds (Note: £1,336,000 in 1891 is equivalent to A$421,000,000 in 2022.) by Loan, for the construction of certain Public Works, and other purposes.
	54 Vict. No. 10	26 February 1891
An Act to confirm certain Expenditure for the year One thousand eight hundred and eighty-nine.
	54 Vict. No. 11	26 February 1891
An Act to confirm certain Expenditure for the year One thousand eight hundred and ninety.
Audit Act 1891	54 Vict. No. 12	26 February 1891
An Act to amend the Law relating to the Receipt, Custody, and Issue of the Public Moneys, the Audit of the Public Accounts, and the Protection and Recovery of the Public Property. (Note: Repeals Audit Act 1881 and Loan Control Act 1882)
General Loan and Inscribed Stock Act 1884 Amendment Act 1891	54 Vict. No. 13	26 February 1891
An Act to amend "The General Loan and Inscribed Stock Act, 1884." (Note: General Loan and Inscribed Stock Act 1884 (48 Vict. No. 4))
South-Western Railway Act 1891	54 Vict. No. 14	26 February 1891
An Act to authorise the construction of a Railway from Bayswater to Bunbury.
Tobacco (Unmanufactured) Duty Act 1891	54 Vict. No. 15	26 February 1891
An Act to increase the Duty payable on Unmanufactured Tobacco.
Scab Act 1891	54 Vict. No. 16	26 February 1891
An Act to repeal " The Scab Act, 1885," (Note: Scab Act 1885 (49 Vict. No. 21)) and to re-enact the same with amendments.

== Sources ==
- "legislation.wa.gov.au".
