= List of ordinances of the Legislative Council of Western Australia from 1859 =

This is a list of ordinances of the Legislative Council of Western Australia for the year 1859.

== 1859 ==
Short title, or popular name	Citation	Royal assent
Long title
	23 Vict. No. 1	18 November 1859
An Ordinance for more effectually preventing Embezzlements by Persons employed in the Public Service of Her Majesty in Western Australia.
	23 Vict. No. 2	18 November 1859
An Ordinance to provide for the summary Discharge, in certain Cases, of Persons under Committal for Felony and Misdemeanour.
	23 Vict. No. 3	18 November 1859
An Ordinance to improve the Administration of the Law so far as respects summary Proceedings before Justices of the Peace.
	23 Vict. No. 4	18 November 1859
An Ordinance to extend the Laws relating to the Post Office.
	23 Vict. No. 5	18 November 1859
An Ordinance to extend and amend "An Ordinance for regulating the Police in Western Australia." (Note: 12 Vict. No. 20) (Repealed by Police Ordinance 1861 (25 Vict. No. 15))
	23 Vict. No. 6	18 November 1859
An Ordinance to naturalize Hyman Lipschitz.
	23 Vict. No. 7	18 November 1859
An Ordinance to naturalize the Reverend Adolphe Joseph Lecaille.
	23 Vict. No. 8	18 November 1859
An Ordinance to amend "An Ordinance for the better Prevention of Offences." (Note: 16 Vict. No. 6)
	23 Vict. No. 9	18 November 1859
An Ordinance to amend and explain the Law relating to the Sale of Colonial Wine.
	23 Vict. No. 10	18 November 1859
An Ordinance to amend "An Ordinance to provide for the Summary Trial and Punishment of Aboriginal Native Offenders in certain Cases." (Note: 12 Vict. No. 18)
	23 Vict. No. 11	18 November 1859
An Ordinance to consolidate and amend the Laws prohibiting the Distillation of Ardent Spirits in Western Australia, and for repealing a certain Ordinance (Note: 4 Vict. No. 7) relating thereto. (Repealed by 35 Vict. No. 12)
	23 Vict. No. 12	18 November 1859
An Ordinance for the further Appropriation of the Revenue for the Year 1858, and for the general Appropriation of the Revenue for the Year 1860.

== Sources ==
- "legislation.wa.gov.au".
