= List of ordinances of the Legislative Council of Western Australia from 1869 =

This is a list of ordinances of the Legislative Council of Western Australia for the year 1869.

== 1869 ==
Short title, or popular name	Citation	Royal assent
Long title
	33 Vict. No. 1	12 July 1869
An Ordinance to amend "The Escheat Ordinance 1867." (Note: Escheat Ordinance 1867 (31 Vict. No. 3))
	33 Vict. No. 2	12 July 1869
An Ordinance to amend "An Ordinance to Supplement the Governor's Salary." (Note: 32 Vict. No. 11)
	33 Vict. No. 3	12 July 1869
An Ordinance to naturalize George Andrew Seubert.
	33 Vict. No. 4	12 July 1869
An Ordinance to naturalize Solomon Pekilman alias Chlom Riechberg.
	33 Vict. No. 5	12 July 1869
An Ordinance to naturalize William Lawrence.
	33 Vict. No. 6	12 July 1869
An Ordinance to repeal "An Ordinance for restricting the Responsibility of the Sheriff of Western Australia." (Note: 15 Vict. No. 2)
Oddfellows' Mortgage Ordinance 1869	33 Vict. No. 7	12 July 1869
An Ordinance to enable the Oddfellows' Lodge at Fremantle to raise money on mortgage.
Medical Ordinance 1869	33 Vict. No. 8	12 July 1869
An Ordinance to regulate the registration of Medical Practitioners.
	33 Vict. No. 9	12 July 1869
An Ordinance to restrict and to regulate the issue of Licenses under the provisions of the Ordinance, 20 Victoria, No. 2. (Note: 20 Vict. No. 2)
	33 Vict. No. 10	12 July 1869
An Ordinance to modify "The Customs Ordinance, 1860." (Note: Customs Ordinance 1860 (24 Vict. No. 5))
	33 Vict. No. 11	12 July 1869
An Ordinance to confirm the Expenditure for the services of the year One thousand eight hundred and sixty-eight, beyond the grant for that year.
	33 Vict. No. 12	12 July 1869
An Ordinance to appropriate the sum of One Hundred and One Thousand Two Hundred and Ninety Four Pounds (Note: £101,294 in 1869 is equivalent to A$16,000,000 in 2022.) out of the General Revenue of the Colony, for the Service of the year One thousand eight hundred and seventy.

== Sources ==
- "legislation.wa.gov.au".
