= List of acts of the Parliament of Western Australia from 1971 =

This is a list of acts of the Parliament of Western Australia for the year 1971.

== 1971 ==
Short title, or popular name	Citation	Royal assent
Long title
Supply Act 1971	No. 1 of 1971	9 Aug 1971
An Act to apply out of the Consolidated Revenue Fund the sum of One Hundred and Seventy-five Million Dollars and from Moneys to Credit of the General Loan Fund Thirty Million Dollars, to the Service of the Year ending 30th June, 1972, and to apply out of the Public Account the Sum of Five Million Dollars for the purpose of temporary Advances to be made by the Treasurer.
Environmental Protection Act 1971	No. 63 of 1971	15 December 1971
An Act to make provision for the establishment of an Environmental Protection Authority, a Department of Environmental Protection and an Environmental Protection Council for the prevention and control of environmental pollution and for the protection and enhancement of the environment, to repeal the Physical Environment Protection Act, 1970, (Note: Physical Environment Protection Act 1970 (No. 93)) and for incidental and other purposes.
	No. X of 1971	
Appropriation Act (General Loan Fund) 1971-1972	No. 71 of 1971	22 December 1971
An Act to appropriate and apply from the General Loan Fund certain sums to make good the supplies granted for the service of the Year ending the 30th day of June, 1972, and to supplement grants made by the last Parliament during its third Session in adjustment of the Vote "Advance to Treasurer, 1970-71," for charges during the Year ended the 30th day of June, 1971.

== Sources ==
- "legislation.wa.gov.au".
