= List of acts of the Parliament of Western Australia from 1969 =

This is a list of acts of the Parliament of Western Australia for the year 1969.

== 1969 ==
Short title, or popular name	Citation	Royal assent
Long title
Criminal Code Amendment Act 1969	No. 1 of 1969	21 April 1969
An Act to amend the Criminal Code.
Lake Lefroy (Coolgardie–Esperance Wharf) Railway Act 1969	No. 45 of 1969	21 May 1969
An Act to authorise the construction of a railway to connect the Coolgardie–Esperance railway to the Esperance land backed wharf and the construction of a spur railway to Lake Lefroy.
	No. X of 1969	
Appropriation Act (General Loan Fund) 1969-70	No. 117 of 1969	28 November 1969
An Act to appropriate and apply from the General Loan Fund certain sums to make good the supplies granted for the service of the Year ending the 30th day of June, 1970, and to supplement grants made by the Present Parliament during its first Session in adjustment of the Vote "Advance to Treasurer, 1968-69," for charges during the Year ended the 30th day of June, 1969.

== Sources ==
- "legislation.wa.gov.au".
