= List of acts of the Legislative Council of Western Australia from 1875 =

This is a list of acts of the Legislative Council of Western Australia for the year 1875.

== 1875 ==
Short title, or popular name	Citation	Royal assent
Long title
Capital Punishment Amendment Act 1871 Amendment Act 1875	39 Vict. No. 1	21 December 1875
An Act to amend 'The Capital Punishment Amendment Act, 1871.' (Note: Capital Punishment Amendment Act 1871 (34 Vict. No. 15))
	39 Vict. No. 2	21 December 1875
An Act to further amend the Law of Evidence.
Distillation Act 1871 Amendment Act 1875	39 Vict. No. 3	21 December 1875
An Act to empower the Governor under certain circumstances to authorise persons to have and use Distilling Apparatus without a License.
	39 Vict. No. 4	21 December 1875
An Act to confirm the Expenditure for the services of the year One thousand eight hundred and seventy-four, beyond the grant for that year.
Colonial Passengers Ordinance Amendment Act 1875	39 Vict. No. 5	21 December 1875
An Act to amend "The Colonial Passengers' Ordinance, 1861." (Note: Colonial Passengers' Ordinance 1861 (25 Vict. No. 9))
Protection of Witnesses Act 1875	39 Vict. No. 6	21 December 1875
An Act to further amend the Administration of Justice.
	39 Vict. No. 7	21 December 1875
An Act to make it lawful to close up certain Streets in the City of Perth.
Bastardy Laws Act 1875	39 Vict. No. 8	21 December 1875
An Act to amend the Bastardy Laws.
	39 Vict. No. 9	21 December 1875
An Act to make provision for the maintenance of Discipline among the Crews of Coasting Vessels.
	39 Vict. No. 10	21 December 1875
An Act to amend the Law relating to Election Petitions and to provide more effectually for the prevention of Corrupt Practices at the Election of Members of the Legislative Council.
Wines, Beer, and Spirit Sale Act 1872 Amendment Act 1875	39 Vict. No. 11	21 December 1875
An Act to further amend "The Wines, Beer, and Spirit Sale Act, 1872." (Note: Wines, Beer, and Spirit Sale Act 1872 (36 Vict. No. 5))
	39 Vict. No. 12	31 December 1875
An Act to make further provision for the Conservation and Improvement of Roads in the several Districts of the Colony.
Pearl Shell Fishery Regulation Act 1875	39 Vict. No. 13	31 December 1875
An Act to make further provision for the regulation of the Pearl Shell Fishery.
High School Act 1875	39 Vict. No. 14	31 December 1875
An Act to make provision for the higher education of Boys.
Offenders' Apprehension Act 1875	39 Vict. No. 15	31 December 1875
An Act to regulate the Execution of Warrants of Arrest.
	39 Vict. No. 16	31 December 1875
An Act to enable the Trustees of 'The Fremantle Lodge No. 1033' of Freemasons to raise Money on Fremantle Town Lot 87.
Perth Drainage Rate Act 1875	39 Vict. No. 17	31 December 1875
An Act to declare valid a certain Rate made by the Perth City Council on the twenty-eighth day of June, one thousand eight hundred and seventy-five, and commonly called the Drainage Rate.
	39 Vict. No. 18	31 December 1875
An Act to appropriate the sum of One Hundred and Fifty-eight Thousand Eight Hundred and Sixty-three Pounds Three Shillings and Twopence (Note: £158,863 3s 2d in 1875 is equivalent to A$23,600,000 in 2022.) out of the General Revenue of the Colony for the Service of the year One thousand eight hundred and seventy-six.

== Sources ==
- "legislation.wa.gov.au".
