= List of acts of the Legislative Council of Western Australia from 1888 =

This is a list of acts of the Legislative Council of Western Australia for the year 1888.

== 1888 ==
Short title, or popular name	Citation	Royal assent
Long title
Geraldton and Northampton Railway Amendment Act 1888	51 Vict. No. 22	6 January 1888
An Act to amend "The Geraldton and Northampton Railway Act, 1873." (Note: Geraldton and Northampton Railway Act 1873 (37 Vict. No. 21))
Tariff Act 1888	51 Vict. No. 23	
Goldfields Act Amendment Act 1888	51 Vict. No. 24	
Australasian Naval Force Act 1888	51 Vict. No. 25	
Telegraphic Messages Amendment Act 1887	51 Vict. No. 26	
Crown Lessees Arbitration Act 1887	51 Vict. No. 27	
	51 Vict. No. 28	
Municipal Footpaths Act 1888	51 Vict. No. 29	
	51 Vict. No. 30	
Re-appropriation Act 1888	51 Vict. No. 31	
Mining Companies Act 1888	51 Vict. No. 32	
	52 Vict. No. 1	
Church of England (Diocesan Trustees) Act 1888 or the Anglican Church of Australia (Diocesan Trustees) Act 1888	52 Vict. No. 2	21 November 1888
An Act to repeal the Act 38 Victoria, No. 18, (Note: 38 Vict. No. 18) and to incorporate a new body of Trustees of the Church of England in Western Australia, to make provision in respect of the Trusts on which certain land is held by the Trustees, and to make provision for the incorporation of the missions or institutions of that Church and for other purposes.
Bank Holidays Act 1884 Amendment Act 1888	52 Vict. No. 3	
	52 Vict. No. 4	
Patent Act 1888	52 Vict. No. 5	
Merchandise Marks Act 1888	52 Vict. No. 6	
Quarantine Act 1888	52 Vict. No. 7	
Gold Declaration Act 1888	52 Vict. No. 8	
	52 Vict. No. 9	
Poor Houses Discipline Act 1888	52 Vict. No. 10	
Scab Act 1888	52 Vict. No. 11	
Supplementary Loan Act 1888	52 Vict. No. 12	
Goldfield Licensing Act 1888	52 Vict. No. 13	
Cemetery Closure Act 1888	52 Vict. No. 14	
	52 Vict. No. 15	
Roads Act 1888	52 Vict. No. 16	
	52 Vict. No. 17	
Newspaper Libel and Registration Act 1884 Amendment Act 1888	52 Vict. No. 18	
Land Regulations Arbitration Act 1888	52 Vict. No. 19	
General Loan and Inscribed Stock Act 1884 Amendment Act 1888	52 Vict. No. 20	
Railways Amendment Act 1888	52 Vict. No. 21	7 December 1888
An Act to make provision for the Construction of certain Accommodation Works on Railways.

== Sources ==
- "legislation.wa.gov.au".
