= List of acts of the Legislative Council of Western Australia from 1871 =

This is a list of acts of the Legislative Council of Western Australia for the year 1871.

== 1871 ==
Short title, or popular name	Citation	Royal assent
Long title
Real Estate Charges Amendment Act 1871	34 Vict. No. 1	2 January 1871
An Act further to amend the Law relating to the Administration of the Estates of deceased persons.
	34 Vict. No. 2	2 January 1871
An Act to provide for the Repayment of Expenses on account of Distressed Colonial Seamen.
	34 Vict. No. 3	2 January 1871
An Act for appropriating certain Lands for the purpose of forming a new Street (Note: Waylen Street, Guildford.) in the Town of Guildford.
	34 Vict. No. 4	2 January 1871
An Ordinance to naturalize Peter Ferrara.
	34 Vict. No. 5	2 January 1871
An Act to amend the Law of Evidence and Practice on Criminal Trials.
Municipal Institutions' Act 1871	34 Vict. No. 6	2 January 1871
An Act for establishing Municipalities.
	34 Vict. No. 7	2 January 1871
An Act to amend the procedure and powers of the Court for Divorce and Matrimonial Causes.
	34 Vict. No. 8	2 January 1871
An Act to enable the Governor to extend "The Fremantle Carriage Ordinance, 1868," (Note: Fremantle Carriage Ordinance 1868 (32 Vict. No. 6)) to other Towns.
Lunacy Act 1871	34 Vict. No. 9	2 January 1871
An Act to provide for the Safe Custody of, and Prevention of Crimes by, persons dangerously Insane; for the Care and Maintenance of persons of Unsound Mind; for the Care and Management and Disposal of the Property and Estates of such persons; and for other purposes.
Evidence Further Amendment Act 1871	34 Vict. No. 10	2 January 1871
An Act for the further amendment of the Law of Evidence.
	34 Vict. No. 11	2 January 1871
An Act to amend the Law relating to Larceny and Embezzlement.
	34 Vict. No. 12	2 January 1871
An Act to abolish the distinction as to Priority of Payment which now exists between the Specialty and Simple Contract Debts of Deceased Persons.
Electro-Magnetic Telegraph Guaranteed Interest Act 1871	34 Vict. No. 13	2 January 1871
An Act to guarantee the payment of Interest upon the paid-up Capital of the Electro-Magnetic Telegraph Company.
	34 Vict. No. 14	2 January 1871
An Act to regulate the hiring and service of Aboriginal Natives engaged in the Pearl Shell Fishery; and to prohibit the employment of women therein.
Capital Punishment Amendment Act 1871	34 Vict. No. 15	2 January 1871
An Act to provide for carrying out of Capital Punishment within Prisons.
	34 Vict. No. 16	11 January 1871
An Act to appropriate the sum of One Hundred and Two Thousand and Ninety-eight Pounds, Seventeen Shillings, and Sixpence, (Note: £102,098 17s 6d in 1871 is equivalent to A$16,800,000 in 2022.) out of the General Revenue of the Colony, for the Service of the year One thousand eight hundred and seventy-one.
Tariff Act 1871	34 Vict. No. 17	11 January 1871
An Act to repeal certain Ordinances for imposing Duties on imported Goods, and for exemption of certain Goods from Duties; and to make other provisions in lieu thereof.
	34 Vict. No. 18	12 January 1871
An Act to prevent the sale, by Unlicensed Persons, of Spirituous and Fermented Liquors.
Railways and Electric Telegraph Protection Act 1871	34 Vict. No. 19	12 January 1871
An Act to make provision for the more effectual protection of Railways and Electric Telegraphs.
Bankruptcy Act 1871	34 Vict. No. 20	13 January 1871
An Act to amend the Law relating to Bankruptcy and Insolvency.
Debtors Act 1871	34 Vict. No. 21	13 January 1871
An Act for the Punishment of Fraudulent Debtors, and for other purposes.
Regulation of Anchorage Act 1871	34 Vict. No. 22	16 January 1871
An Act for the Regulation of Coasting Vessels and Cargo and other Boats entering the Ports and Harbours of this Colony.
Scab-in-Sheep Ordinance Amendment Act 1871	34 Vict. No. 23	16 January 1871
An Act to amend the "Scab-in-Sheep Ordinance, 1866." (Note: Scab in Sheep Ordinance 1866 (30 Vict. No. 13))
Wild Cattle Nuisance Act 1871	34 Vict. No. 24	16 January 1871
An Act for more effectually abating the Wild Horses and Cattle Nuisance.
	34 Vict. No. 25	16 January 1871
An Act to amend "The Public Pound Ordinance, 1861." (Note: Public Pound Ordinance 1861 (25 Vict. No. 15))
District Roads Act 1871	34 Vict. No. 26	17 January 1871
An Act to establish Local Boards for the conservation, improvement, and making of Roads in the several Districts of the Colony.
	34 Vict. No. 27	17 January 1871
An Act to facilitate the arrest of Absconding Debtors. (Repealed by Absconding Debtors Act 1877 (41 Vict. No. 17))
Police Ordinance Amendment Act 1871	34 Vict. No. 28	17 January 1871
An Act to alter and amend the 12th Section and to repeal the 35th Section of the "Police Ordinance, 1861," (Note: Police Ordinance 1861 (25 Vict. No. 15)) and to enact another clause in lieu thereof.
Oyster Fishery Amendment Act 1871	34 Vict. No. 29	17 January 1871
An Act to amend "An Ordinance for protecting the Oyster Fisheries on the Coasts of this Colony." (Note: 28 Vict. No. 4)
	34 Vict. No. 30	17 August 1871 (Note: Royal assent delayed as the act was reserved for approval by Her Majesty, rather than by the governor.)
An Act to amend the Representation of the People, and to alter the Property Qualification of Members of the Legislative Council.
	35 Vict. No. 1	4 August 1871
An Act to confirm the Expenditure for the services of the year One thousand eight hundred and seventy, beyond the grant for that year.
Naturalisation Act 1871	35 Vict. No. 2	4 August 1871
An Act for the Naturalization of Aliens within the Colony of Western Australia.
	35 Vict. No. 3	4 August 1871
An Act to empower the Chief Justice to grant commissions for taking affidavits to be made use of in the Supreme Court, and for taking the acknowledgments of Deeds executed by married women.
	35 Vict. No. 4	4 August 1871
An Act to make further provision for the Maintenance of Bastard Children by their Putative Fathers.
Dangerous Goods Act 1871	35 Vict. No. 5	4 August 1871
An Act for the Carriage and Safe-keeping of Explosive and Dangerous Goods.
Distillation Act 1871	35 Vict. No. 6	8 August 1871
An Act to regulate the Distillation, Rectifying and Compounding of Spirits, to grant a Duty upon Spirits distilled in Western Australia, and to regulate the Sale of Fermented and Spirituous Liquors in certain cases.
Superannuation Act 1871	35 Vict. No. 7	8 August 1871
An Act to regulate Superannuations and other Allowances to Persons having held Civil Offices in the Public Service under the Colonial Government.
Jury Act 1871	35 Vict. No. 8	8 August 1871
An Act to amend the Laws relative to Juries.
Export of Arms and Munitions of War Prohibition Act 1871	35 Vict. No. 9	8 August 1871
An Act to prohibit the Export of Arms and Munitions of War.
Sheep Branding Act 1871	35 Vict. No. 10	17 August 1871
An Act to provide for the Registration of Brands for Sheep.
Inquiries into Wrecks Ordinance 1864 Amendment Act 1871	35 Vict. No. 11	17 August 1871
An Act to amend the Ordinance intituled "The Inquiries into Wrecks Ordinance, 1864." (Note: Inquiries into Wrecks Ordinance 1864 (28 Vict. No. 2))
	35 Vict. No. 12	17 August 1871
An Act to repeal an Ordinance passed in the twenty-third year of the reign of Her Majesty Queen Victoria, intituled 'An Ordinance to consolidate and amend the Laws prohibiting the Distillation of Ardent Spirits in Western Australia, and for repealing a certain Ordinance relating thereto.' (Note: 23 Vict. No. 11)
	35 Vict. No. 13	17 August 1871
An Act to repeal the Twenty-seventh Victoria, No. 18, intituled "An Ordinance to regulate the Pensioners' Benevolent Society." (Note: 27 Vict. No. 18)
Elementary Education Act 1871	35 Vict. No. 14	17 August 1871
An Act to provide for Public Elementary Education, and to encourage voluntary efforts in support of Schools.
	35 Vict. No. 15	17 August 1871
An Act to appropriate the sum of Ninety-eight Thousand and Thirty-six Pounds, Fourteen Shillings, and Twopence, (Note: £98,036 14s 2d in 1871 is equivalent to A$16,100,000 in 2022.) out of the General Revenue of the Colony, for the Service of the year One thousand eight hundred and seventy-two.

== Sources ==
- "legislation.wa.gov.au".
