= List of acts of the Parliament of Western Australia from 1944 =

This is a list of acts of the Parliament of Western Australia for the year 1944.

== 1944 ==
Short title, or popular name	Citation	Royal assent
Long title
	No. 1 of 1944	1 September 1944
An Act to apply out of the Consolidated Revenue Fund the sum of Two Million Two Hundred Thousand Pounds, and from Moneys to Credit of the General Loan Fund Two Hundred Thousand Pounds, to the Service of the Year ending 30th June, 1945, and to apply out of the Public Account the sum of Three Hundred Thousand Pounds for the purpose of temporary Advances to be made by the Treasurer.
Dried Fruits Act Amendment Act 1944	No. 2 of 1944	12 October 1944
An Act to continue the operation of the Dried Fruits Act 1926-1937. (Note: Dried Fruits Act 1926 (No. 49))
	No. X of 1944	
Appropriation Act 1944-45	No. 50 of 1944	24 Jan 1945
An Act to appropriate and apply out of the Consolidated Revenue Fund and from Moneys to Credit of the General Loan Fund and from the Public Account certain sums to make good the supplies granted for the service of the Year ending the thirtieth day of June, One thousand nine hundred and forty-five, and to supplement grants made by the previous Parliament during its last Session in adjustment of the Vote "Advance to Treasurer, 1943-44," for charges during the Year ended the 30th day of June, 1944; and to approve of certain expenditure under section forty-one of the Forests Act, 1918-1931. (Note: Forests Act 1918 (No. 8 of 1919))
Rural and Industries Bank Act 1944	No. 51 of 1944	1 February 1945
An Act to constitute and regulate and provide for the management of a Rural and Industries Bank to take the place of the Agricultural Bank of Western Australia; to authorise such Bank to receive deposits, borrow money, and to make loans and investments, and generally to carry on the business of banking; to provide for a government guarantee of any indebtedness of such Bank; to repeal or amend Acts dealing with the Agricultural Bank of Western Australia and with advances to persons engaged in rural industries; to provide for the transfer of certain assets liabilities and powers to such Bank; and for other purposes consequent thereon or incidental thereto.

== Sources ==
- "legislation.wa.gov.au".
