= List of ordinances of the Legislative Council of Western Australia from 1835 =

This is a list of ordinances of the Legislative Council of Western Australia for the year 1835.

== 1835 ==
Short title, or popular name	Citation	Royal assent
Long title
	5 Will. IV. No. 6	2 April 1835
An Act for applying certain Sums arising from the, Revenue receivable in the Colony of Western Australia to the Service thereof, for the Financial Year commencing 1st April, 1835. (Repealed by Statute Law Revision Act 1964 (13 Eliz. II. No. 61))

== Sources ==
- "legislation.wa.gov.au".
