= List of acts of the Parliament of Western Australia from 1989 =

This is a list of acts of the Parliament of Western Australia for the year 1989.

== 1989 ==
Short title, or popular name	Citation	Royal assent
Long title
Supply Act 1989	No. 1 of 1989	14 April 1989
An Act to apply out of the Consolidated Revenue Fund the sum of $2,300,000,000 and out of the General Loan and Capital Works Fund the sum of $200,000,000 for the service of the Year ending 30 June 1990.
Perth–Joondalup Railway Act 1989	No. 45 of 1989	15 January 1990
An Act to authorize the construction of a railway from Perth to Joondalup.
	No. X of 1989	
University of Notre Dame Australia Act 1989	No. 49 of 1989	9 January 1990
An Act to provide for the establishment and incorporation of The University of Notre Dame Australia and for related purposes.

== Sources ==
- "legislation.wa.gov.au".
