= List of ordinances of the Legislative Council of Western Australia from 1855 =

This is a list of ordinances of the Legislative Council of Western Australia for the year 1855.

== 1855 ==
Short title, or popular name	Citation	Royal assent
Long title
	18 Vict. No. 1	12 April 1855
An Ordinance to regulate the Forms to be observed by Pardoned Convicts prior to their leaving the Colony.
	18 Vict. No. 2	12 April 1855
An Ordinance to amend the Public House Licensing Ordinance, 4th and 5th Victoriæ, No. 8. (Note: Public House Licensing Ordinance 1841 (4 & 5 Vict. No. 8))
Small Savings Ordinance 1855 (repealed)	18 Vict. No. 3	12 April 1855
An Ordinance to provide for the encouragement, safe custody, and increase of Small Savings in Western Australia. (Repealed by 19 Vict. No. 9)
	18 Vict. No. 4	13 April 1855
An Ordinance to amend the 16th Victoria, No. 4, (Note: Branding Ordinance 1852 (16 Vict. No. 4)) commonly called the Branding Ordinance.
	18 Vict. No. 5	13 April 1855
An Ordinance to abolish Grand Juries, and to substitute other provisions in lieu thereof.
Larceny Summary Conviction Ordinance 1855	18 Vict. No. 6	13 April 1855
An Ordinance for the more speedy trial and punishment of offences in cases of larceny, under £5 Sterling. (Note: £5 in 1855 is equivalent to A$430 in 2022.)
	18 Vict. No. 7	16 April 1855
An Ordinance to provide for an Excess of Expenditure in the Year 1854 over and above the Estimates for the same.
	18 Vict. No. 8	17 April 1855
An Ordinance to amend the Law relative to the Registration of Deeds, Wills, Judgments, and Conveyances affecting real property.
	18 Vict. No. 9	17 April 1855
An Ordinance for the further regulation of Practitioners in the Civil Court. (Repealed by Supreme Court Ordinance 1861 (24 Vict. No. 15))
Service and Execution of Process (Harbours) Ordinance 1855	18 Vict. No. 10	17 April 1855
An Ordinance to remove doubts as to the service or execution of Common Law Process on the Sea within the Harbours of Western Australia.
	18 Vict. No. 11	18 April 1855
An Ordinance for the better observance of the Lord's Day, and the more effectual prevention of Drunkenness.
	18 Vict. No. 12	18 April 1855
An Ordinance for the Abolition of unnecessary Oaths, and to substitute Declarations in lieu thereof.
Wills Act Amendment Ordinance 1855	18 Vict. No. 13	20 April 1855
An Ordinance for the amendment of the Laws with respect to Wills.
	18 Vict. No. 14	20 April 1855
An Ordinance for the further amendment of the Laws with respect to Evidence.
Shipping and Pilotage Consolidation Ordinance 1855	18 Vict. No. 15	26 April 1855
An Ordinance to consolidate and amend the Laws for the Regulation of Shipping, and of Pilotage and other Dues, in the Harbours of Western Australia,
	18 Vict. No. 16	24 April 1855
An Ordinance to enable the Denomination of Christians called Congregationalists or Independents in the Colony of Western Australia to hold Lands, to raise a sum or sums of Money on the security of such Lands, and for other purposes therein mentioned.
	18 Vict. No. 17	26 April 1855
An Ordinance to provide for the payment of certain unforeseen Expenses in the year 1855, and also for the appropriation of the Revenue for the service of the year 1856.
	18 Vict. No. 18	26 April 1855
An Ordinance to repeal the Ordinance No. 19 of 1851, (Note: 14 Vict. No. 19) and to revise and amend certain parts of the Ordinance No. 2 of 1833. (Note: 3 Will. IV. No. 2)
	19 Vict. No. 1	10 September 1855
An Ordinance to amend an Ordinance passed in the present year, No. 17, (Note: 18 Vict. No. 17) and to provide for the appropriation of the Revenue for the service of the year 1856.
	19 Vict. No. 2	
An Ordinance to amend the Towns Improvement Amending Ordinance, (Note: Towns Improvement Amending Ordinance 1852 (15 Vict. No. 9)) 15th Victoria, No. 9. (Repealed by Municipal Institutions' Act 1871 (34 Vict. No. 6))

== Sources ==
- "legislation.wa.gov.au".
