= List of acts of the Parliament of Western Australia from 2015 =

This is a list of acts of the Parliament of Western Australia for the year 2015.

== 2015 ==
Short title, or popular name	Citation	Royal assent
Long title
Taxation Legislation Amendment Act 2015	No. 1 of 2015	25 February 2015
An Act to amend the following Acts—: the Duties Act 2008; (Note: Duties Act 2008 (No. 11)); the Land Tax Assessment Act 2002. (Note: Land Tax Assessment Act 2002 (No. 52))
Railway (Forrestfield–Airport Link) Act 2015	No. 34 of 2015	2 November 2015
An Act to authorise the construction of a railway from Bayswater to Forrestfield (known as the Forrestfield–Airport Link).
	No. X of 2015	
Perth Market (Disposal) Act 2015	No. 40 of 2015	8 December 2015
An Act to provide for the disposal of the whole or part of any business carried on by, or all or any of the assets or liabilities owned by or managed on behalf of the State by, the Perth Market Authority, and for related purposes.

== Sources ==
- "legislation.wa.gov.au".
