= List of acts of the Parliament of Western Australia from 2011 =

This is a list of acts of the Parliament of Western Australia for the year 2011.

== 2011 ==
Short title, or popular name	Citation	Royal assent
Long title
Health, Safety and Civil Liability (Children in Schools and Child Care Services) Act 2011	No. 1 of 2011	1 March 2011
An Act to amend the Civil Liability Act 2002 (Note: Civil Liability Act 2002 (No. 35)) and the School Education Act 1999. (Note: School Education Act 1999 (No. 36))
Metropolitan Redevelopment Authority Act 2011	No. 45 of 2011	12 October 2011
An Act to—: provide for the planning and redevelopment of, and the control of development in, certain land in the metropolitan region; and; establish a State agency with planning, development control, land acquisition and disposal and other functions in respect of that land; and; provide for related matters, including the repeal or amendment of certain Acts.
Statutes (Repeals and Minor Amendments) Act 2011	No. 47 of 2011	25 October 2011
An Act to amend the statute law by repealing various written laws and making minor amendments to various other written laws.
	No. X of 2011	
Iron Ore Agreements Legislation (Amendment, Termination and Repeals) Act 2011	No. 62 of 2011	14 December 2011
An Act—: to amend these Acts—; the Iron Ore (Mount Newman) Agreement Act 1964; (Note: Iron Ore (Mount Newman) Agreement Act 1964 (No. 75)); the Iron Ore (Mount Goldsworthy) Agreement Act 1964; (Note: Iron Ore (Mount Goldsworthy) Agreement Act 1964 (No. 97)); the Iron Ore (Goldsworthy-Nimingarra) Agreement Act 1972; (Note: Iron Ore (Goldsworthy-Nimingarra) Agreement Act 1972 (No. 30)); the Iron Ore (McCamey's Monster) Agreement Authorisation Act 1972; (Note: Iron Ore (McCamey's Monster) Agreement Authorisation Act 1972 (No. 104)); the Iron Ore (Marillana Creek) Agreement Act 1991; (Note: Iron Ore (Marillana Creek) Agreement Act 1991 (No. 2)); and: to ratify an agreement between the State and BHP Billiton Direct Reduced Iron Pty. Ltd. and others that provides for the termination of an agreement made on 16 October 1995 and subsequently varied by an agreement made on 11 April 2000, between the State and BHP Billiton Direct Reduced Iron Pty. Ltd. (under its former name, BHP Direct Reduced Iron Pty. Ltd.);

== Sources ==
- "legislation.wa.gov.au".
