= List of ordinances of the Legislative Council of Western Australia from 1849 =

This is a list of ordinances of the Legislative Council of Western Australia for the year 1849.

== 1849 ==
Short title, or popular name	Citation	Royal assent
Long title
	12 Vict. No. 6	9 May 1849
An Ordinance to make perpetual an Ordinance intituled "An Ordinance to provide further remedies against Trespasses by Live Stock, and to promote the construction of Fences." (Note: 10 Vict. No. 13) (Repealed by Cattle Trespass Ordinance 1857 (21 Vict. No. 7))
	12 Vict. No. 7	9 May 1849
An Ordinance for the Regulation of Gaols, Prisons, and Houses of Correction in the Colony of Western Australia, and for other purposes relating thereto.
	12 Vict. No. 8	9 May 1849
An Ordinance to repeal certain Ordinances for imposing Duties on Imported Goods, and for Exemption of certain Goods from Duties, and to make other provisions in lieu thereof. (Repealed by 17 Vict. No. 14)
	12 Vict. No. 9	9 May 1849
An Ordinance to remove doubts as to the Naturalization of Johann August Ludwig Preiss, Frederick Waldeck, Benjamin Franklin Simmons, and Frantz Anthon Didrich Christian Helmich.
	12 Vict. No. 10	9 May 1849
An Ordinance to naturalize Abraham Myers, Solomon Cook, Don Rosendo Salvado, the Rev. I. J. Joostens, and Louis Langoulant
	12 Vict. No. 11	9 May 1849
An Ordinance to provide for the Solemnization and Registration of Marriages of persons belonging to certain Denominations of Christians, not being Members of the Church of England.
	12 Vict. No. 12	9 May 1849
An Ordinance to amend the existing Laws respecting the Solemnization of Matrimony.
	12 Vict. No. 13	9 May 1849
An Ordinance to amend an Ordinance intituled "An Act to provide for the Registration of Births, Deaths and Marriages, in the Colony of Western Australia." (Note: 4 & 5 Vict. No. 19)
	12 Vict. No. 14	9 May 1849
An Ordinance to revive and continue an Ordinance, intituled "An Act to allow the Aboriginal Natives of Western Australia to give information and evidence without the sanction of an Oath." (Note: 4 & 5 Vict. No. 22)
	12 Vict. No. 15	9 May 1849
An Ordinance to provide for the reduction or modification of the Toll upon Sandalwood, and for the appropriation thereof.
	12 Vict. No. 16	9 May 1849
An Ordinance to extend the provisions of an Ordinance (Note: 6 Vict. No. 8) to Regulate the Apprenticeship and otherwise to provide for the Guardianship and Control of a certain class of Juvenile Immigrants to other classes than those specially mentioned therein.
	12 Vict. No. 17	9 May 1849
An Ordinance to facilitate the recovery of Contributions in certain cases between Shareholders in Banking Companies.
	12 Vict. No. 18	9 May 1849
An Ordinance to provide for the Summary Trial and Punishment of Aboriginal Native Offenders in certain cases.
	12 Vict. No. 19	9 May 1849
An Ordinance to provide for the establishment of a Scale of Pilotage Fees and Light Dues.
	12 Vict. No. 20	11 May 1849
An Ordinance for regulating the Police in Western Australia. (Repealed by Police Ordinance 1861 (25 Vict. No. 15))
Imperial Acts Adopting Ordinance 1849	12 Vict. No. 21	11 May 1849
An Ordinance for adopting certain Acts of the Imperial Parliament.
	12 Vict. No. 22	11 May 1849
An Ordinance for the appropriation of the Revenue for the Year One Thousand Eight Hundred and Fifty and to provide for the payment of certain unforeseen expenses during the Year One Thousand Eight Hundred and Forty-nine. (Repealed by Statute Law Revision Act 1964 (13 Eliz. II. No. 61))
	12 Vict. No. 23	16 May 1849
An Ordinance to alter the existing Law for the Establishment of a Central Board of Works, and to make other provision instead thereof.
	12 Vict. No. 24	18 May 1849
An Ordinance to extend the Law of Quarantine.
	12 Vict. No. 25	21 May 1849
An Ordinance to regulate the Keeping and Carriage of Gunpowder.
	13 Vict. No. 1	29 December 1849
An Ordinance to provide for the due custody and discipline of Offenders transported to Western Australia; and of certain classes of Offenders sentenced therein to Transportation.

== Sources ==
- "legislation.wa.gov.au".
