= List of acts of the Parliament of Western Australia from 1920 =

This is a list of acts of the Parliament of Western Australia for the year 1920.

== 1920 ==
Short title, or popular name	Citation	Royal assent
Long title
	No. 1 of 1920	17 August 1920
An Act to apply out of the Consolidated Revenue Fund the sum of Nine Hundred and Forty-four Thousand Pounds, and from Moneys to Credit of the General Loan Fund Seven Hundred and Fifty Thousand Pounds, and from Moneys to Credit of the Government Property Sales Fund Fifty Thousand Pounds, and from Moneys to Credit of the Land Improvement Loan Fund Fifteen Thousand Pounds, to the Service of the Year ending 30th June, 1921, and to apply out of the Public Account the sum of Three Hundred Thousand Pounds for the purposes of temporary advances to be made by the Colonial Treasurer.
Time of Registration Extension Act 1920	No. 2 of 1920	9 October 1920
An Act to extend the time for the presentation, registration, or lodgment of documents in any public office or registry the operations of which were recently temporarily suspended, and to extend the period for, and to validate the stamping of, certain documents.
Parliament (Qualification of Women) Act 1920 (repealed)	No. 7 of 1920	3 November 1920
An Act to amend the Law with respect to the Capacity of Women to sit in Parliament. (Repealed by Acts Amendment (Equality of Status) Act 2003 (No. 28))
	No. 9 of 1920	3 November 1920
An Act to apply out of the Consolidated Revenue Fund the sum of Three Hundred and Fifty Thousand Pounds (£350,000) to the Service of the Year ending 30th June, 1921.
City of Perth Endowment Lands Act 1920 or the Cambridge Endowment Lands Act 1920	No. 31 of 1920	31 December 1920
An Act ~~to extend the Boundaries of the City of Perth, and to give the City of Perth powers of dealing with certain Endowment and other Lands~~ relating to lands known as the Endowment Lands and the Lime Kilns Estate.
Piawaning Northwards Railway Act 1920	No. 37 of 1920	31 December 1920
An Act to authorise the Construction of a Railway from Piawaning Northwards.
Railways Classification Board Act 1920 (repealed)	No. 38 of 1920	31 December 1920
An Act to provide for a Board for the Classification of the Salaried Staff of the Government Railways. (Repealed by Acts Amendment and Repeal (Industrial Relations) Act (No. 2) 1984 (No. 94))
Meekatharra–Horseshoe Railway Act 1920	No. 46 of 1920	31 December 1920
An Act to authorise the Construction and Working of a Railway from Meekatharra to Horseshoe, near Peak Hill.
	No. X of 1920	
Divorce Act Amendment Act 1920	No. 52 of 1920	31 December 1920
An Act to further amend the Law relating to Divorce and Matrimonial Causes.

== Sources ==
- "legislation.wa.gov.au".
