= List of ordinances of the Legislative Council of Western Australia from 1845 =

This is a list of ordinances of the Legislative Council of Western Australia for the year 1845.

== 1845 ==
Short title, or popular name	Citation	Royal assent
Long title
	8 Vict. No. 11	5 June 1844
An Ordinance for avoiding unnecessary repetitions in the Ordinances of the Governor and Legislative Council of Western Australia.
	8 Vict. No. 12	5 June 1844
An Ordinance to remove doubts as to the power of Justices of the Peace of the Colony of Western Australia to inflict Penalties under certain Acts of Parliament.
	9 Vict. No. 1	25 June 1845
An Act for applying certain Sums arising from the Revenue receivable in the Colony of Western Australia to the service thereof, for the Financial Year commencing First of April, One thousand eight hundred and forty-six. (Repealed by Statute Law Revision Act 1964 (13 Eliz. II. No. 61))
Destitute Persons Relief Ordinance 1845	9 Vict. No. 2	23 July 1845
An Ordinance to provide for the Maintenance and Relief of Deserted Wives and Children, and other Destitute Persons, and to make the property of Husbands and near Relatives, to whose assistance they have a natural claim, in certain circumstances, available for support.
	9 Vict. No. 3	7 August 1845
An Ordinance to authorise the Governor of Western Australia to raise the sum of Two Thousand Pounds on Loan, for the erection of a Gaol, or for other public services of the colony.
	9 Vict. No. 4	18 August 1845
An Ordinance to make provision for the Trial of Criminal Offences at Albany and other remote Districts of the Colony of Western Australia.
	9 Vict. No. 5	18 August 1845
An Ordinance to regulate the Constitution of Juries for the trial of criminal offences in Albany, and other remote Districts of the colony of Western Australia, and to limit the right of Challenge to some extent in certain cases.
	9 Vict. No. 6	18 September 1845
An Ordinance to provide for the Conveyance and Postage of Letters.

== Sources ==
- "legislation.wa.gov.au".
