= List of ordinances of the Legislative Council of Western Australia from 1852 =

This is a list of ordinances of the Legislative Council of Western Australia for the year 1852.

== 1852 ==
Short title, or popular name	Citation	Royal assent
Long title
	15 Vict. No. 5	19 May 1852
An Ordinance to amend an Ordinance intituled "An Ordinance to provide for the Conveyance and Postage of Letters." (Note: 9 Vict. No. 6)
	15 Vict. No. 6	21 May 1852
An Ordinance for the Naturalization of John Simpkins Barker and Thomas Pope.
	15 Vict. No. 7	26 May 1852
An Ordinance tor the Appropriation of the Revenue for the Year 1853. (Repealed by Statute Law Revision Act 1964 (13 Eliz. II. No. 61))
	15 Vict. No. 8	26 May 1852
An Ordinance to provide for the payment of certain unforeseen expenses during the Year 1852. (Repealed by Statute Law Revision Act 1964 (13 Eliz. II. No. 61))
Towns Improvement Amending Ordinance 1852 (repealed)	15 Vict. No. 9	26 May 1852
An Ordinance to repeal an Ordinance, 14th Vict., No 26, intituled, "An Ordinance for the further Improvement of Towns, and the greater security of Life and Property therein," (Note: Towns Improvement Ordinance 1851 (14 Vict. No. 26)) and to make other provisions in lieu thereof. (Repealed by Municipal Institutions' Act 1871 (34 Vict. No. 6))
	16 Vict. No. 1	17 December 1852
An Ordinance to provide for the payment of certain unforeseen expenses during the Year 1852. (Repealed by Statute Law Revision Act 1964 (13 Eliz. II. No. 61))
	16 Vict. No. 2	17 December 1852
An Ordinance for Licensing Hawkers and Pedlers. (Repealed by 25 Vict. No. 4)
	16 Vict. No. 3	17 December 1852
An Ordinance to Repeal an Ordinance, passed in the 10th year of the reign of Her present Majesty, No. 9, entitled "An Ordinance to authorise the sale of Wines in smaller quantities than those hitherto appointed by Law," (Note: 10 Vict. No. 9) and to make other provisions in lieu thereof.
Branding Ordinance 1852	16 Vict. No. 4	20 December 1852
An Ordinance to regulate the Branding of Live Stock.
	16 Vict. No. 5	20 December 1852
An Ordinance for the removal of defects in the administration of Criminal Justice.
	16 Vict. No. 6	20 December 1852
An Ordinance for the better prevention of Offences.
Private Slaughter House Ordinance 1852	16 Vict. No. 7	22 December 1852
An Ordinance to repeal an Act, passed the 6th year of Her present Majesty, No. 1, entitled "An Act to regulate the slaughtering of Cattle and other Stock in Towns," (Note: 6 Vict. No. 1) and to enact other provisions in lieu thereof.
	16 Vict. No. 8	22 December 1852
An Ordinance for further improving the administration of Criminal Justice.
	16 Vict. No. 9	22 December 1852
An Ordinance to amend the Law of Evidence.
Public Slaughter House Ordinance 1852	16 Vict. No. 10	22 December 1852
An Ordinance to provide for the establishment of Public Slaughter Houses, and to regulate the Slaughtering of Stock therein.

== Sources ==
- "legislation.wa.gov.au".
