= List of acts of the Parliament of Western Australia from 1947 =

This is a list of acts of the Parliament of Western Australia for the year 1947.

== 1947 ==
Short title, or popular name	Citation	Royal assent
Long title
	No. 1 of 1947	26 September 1947
An Act to apply out of the Consolidated Revenue Fund the sum of Two Million Four Hundred Thousand Pounds, and from Moneys to Credit of the General Loan Fund Four Hundred Thousand Pounds, to the Service of the Year ending 30th June, 1948, and to apply out of the Public Account the sum of Three Hundred Thousand Pounds for the purpose of temporary Advances to be made by the Treasurer,
Constitution Acts Amendment Act (No. 1) 1947	No. 2 of 1947	26 September 1947
An Act to amend section thirty-seven of the Constitution Acts Amendment Act, 1899 (63 Vict. 19). (Note: Constitution Acts Amendment Act 1899 (63 Vict. No. 19))
Electoral Districts Act 1947 or the Electoral Distribution Act 1947 (repealed)	No. 51 of 1947	19 Dec 1947
An Act to repeal the Redistribution of Seats Act, 1911, (Note: Redistribution of Seats Act 1911 (No. 6)) the Electoral Districts Act, 1922, (Note: Electoral Districts Act 1922 (No. 10 of 1923)) and the Redistribution of Seats Act, 1929, (Note: Redistribution of Seats Act 1929 (No. 1)) and amendments thereto; and to make provision for the better representation of the people of Western Australia in Parliament. (Repealed by Electoral Amendment and Repeal Act 2005 (No. 1))
	No. X of 1947	
Municipal Corporations Act Amendment Act 1947	No. 86 of 1947	14 January 1948
An Act to amend the Municipal Corporations Act, 1906-1946. (Note: Municipal Corporations Act 1906 (No. 32))

== Sources ==
- "legislation.wa.gov.au".
