= List of ordinances of the Legislative Council of Western Australia from 1867 =

This is a list of ordinances of the Legislative Council of Western Australia for the year 1867.

== 1867 ==
| Short title, or popular name | Citation | Royal assent |
Long title
| | 31 Vict. No. 1 | 15 July 1867 |
An Ordinance to declare the Trusts upon which Churches, Chapels, and Ministers' Dwellings belonging to the Religious Society called Wesleyan Methodists shall be held.
| Casual Revenue Appropriation Ordinance 1867 | 31 Vict. No. 2 | 15 July 1867 |
An Ordinance to provide for the Appropriation of the Casual Revenue of the Crown arising from Escheated Estates.
| Escheat Ordinance 1867 | 31 Vict. No. 3 | 15 July 1867 |
An Ordinance to declare the Law and Practice in cases of Escheat.
| | 31 Vict. No. 4 | 15 July 1867 |
An Ordinance to Reduce the Duty on the Importation of Tobacco intended for Sheep Wash.
| | 31 Vict. No. 5 | 15 July 1867 |
An Ordinance to naturalize Bartolomi Ramis.
| Naval and Victualling Stores Ordinance 1867 | 31 Vict. No. 6 | 15 July 1867 |
An Ordinance for the Protection of Her Majesty's Naval and Victualling Store
| | 31 Vict. No. 7 | 15 July 1867 |
An Ordinance to facilitate Proceedings by Persons having Claims against the Government.
| Imperial Acts Adopting Ordinance 1867 | 31 Vict. No. 8 | 15 July 1867 |
An Ordinance for adopting certain Acts of the Imperial Parliament.
| | 31 Vict. No. 9 | 15 July 1867 |
An Ordinance to amend an Ordinance intituled "An Ordinance to incorporate The National Bank of Australasia; and for other purposes." (Note: 30 Vict. No. 9)
| | 31 Vict. No. 10 | 15 July 1867 |
An Ordinance further to amend the Laws relating to Trespasses by Live Stock.
| | 31 Vict. No. 11 | 15 July 1867 |
An Ordinance to naturalize Herman Look.
| | 31 Vict. No. 12 | 15 July 1867 |
An Ordinance to confirm the Expenditure for the Services of the Year One Thousand Eight Hundred and Sixty-Six beyond the grant for that year.
| | 31 Vict. No. 13 | 15 July 1867 |
An Ordinance to appropriate the sum of Ninety-three Thousand Nine Hundred and Eighty-eight Pounds (Note: £93,988 in 1867 is equivalent to A$14,900,000 in 2022.) out of the General Revenue of the Colony for the service of the year one thousand eight hundred and sixty-eight.
| | 31 Vict. No. 14 | 15 July 1867 |
An Ordinance to naturalize August Bothe.

== Sources ==
- "legislation.wa.gov.au".
