= List of acts of the Parliament of Western Australia from 1950 =

This is a list of acts of the Parliament of Western Australia for the year 1950.

== 1950 ==
Short title, or popular name	Citation	Royal assent
Long title
	No. 1 of 1950	2 October 1950
An Act to apply out of the Consolidated Revenue Fund the sum of Four Million Pounds (Note: £4,000,000 in 1950 is equivalent to A$230,000,000 in 2022.) and from Moneys to Credit of the General Loan Fund One Million Five Hundred Thousand Pounds, to the Service of the Year ending 30th June, 1951, and to apply out of the Public Account the sum of Five Hundred Thousand Pounds (Note: £500,000 in 1950 is equivalent to A$29,000,000 in 2022.) for the purpose of temporary Advances to be made by the Treasurer.
Acts Amendment (Increase in number of Ministers of the Crown) Act 1950	No. 2 of 1950	24 October 1950
An Act to amend certain Acts to provide for an increase from eight to ten in the number of principal executive offices of the Government liable to be vacated on political grounds.
Railway (Upper Darling Range) Discontinuance Act 1950	No. 66 of 1950	29 December 1950
An Act to authorise the Discontinuance of the Upper Darling Range Railway.
	No. X of 1950	
Fauna Protection Act 1950 or the Fauna Conservation Act 1950 or the Wildlife Conservation Act 1950	No. 77 of 1950	5 January 1951
An Act to provide for the Conservation and Protection of ~~Fauna~~ Wildlife.

== Sources ==
- "legislation.wa.gov.au".
