= List of acts of the Legislative Council of Western Australia from 1872 =

This is a list of acts of the Legislative Council of Western Australia for the year 1872.

== 1872 ==
Short title, or popular name	Citation	Royal assent
Long title
	36 Vict. No. 1	15 August 1872
An Act to regulate Grants of Patents for Inventions in the Colony of Western Australia.
	36 Vict. No. 2	15 August 1872
An Act to confirm the Expenditure for the services of the year One thousand eight hundred and seventy-one beyond the grant for that year.
Public Works Loan Act 1872	36 Vict. No. 3	15 August 1872
An Act for raising the sum of Thirty-five Thousand Pounds (Note: £35,000 in 1872 is equivalent to A$6,000,000 in 2022.) by Loan for the Construction of certain Public Works.
Tariff Act 1872 (repealed)	36 Vict. No. 4	30 August 1872
An Act to repeal an Act (Note: 34 Vict. No. 17) for imposing Duties on imported Goods, and for exemption of certain Goods from Duties; and to make other provisions in lieu thereof. (Repealed by Tariff Act 1876 (40 Vict. No. 6))
Wines, Beer, and Spirit Sale Act 1872	36 Vict. No. 5	30 August 1872
An Act to Consolidate and Amend the Laws relating to the Licensing of Public Houses, and the Sale of Fermented and Spirituous Liquors.
Scab in Sheep Amendment Act 1872 (repealed)	36 Vict. No. 6	30 August 1872
An Act to amend the "Scab-in-Sheep Ordinance, 1866," (Note: Scab in Sheep Ordinance 1866 (30 Vict. No. 13)) and to Repeal the "Scab-in-Sheep Ordinance Amendment Act, 1871." (Note: Scab in Sheep Ordinance Amendment Act 1871 (34 Vict. No. 23)) (Repealed by Scab Act 1879 (43 Vict. No. 16))
Telegram Copyright Act 1872	36 Vict. No. 7	30 August 1872
An Act to Secure in Certain Cases the Right of Property in Telegraphic Messages.
Waste Lands Unlawful Occupation Act 1872	36 Vict. No. 8	30 August 1872
An Act to prevent the Unauthorised Occupation of Waste Lands of the Crown.
Trespass Act 1872	36 Vict. No. 9	30 August 1872
An Act to consolidate and amend the Laws relating to Trespasses by Live Stock and to promote the construction of Fences.
Geraldton Sand-hills Planting Act 1872	36 Vict. No. 10	30 August 1872
An Act to enable the Municipal Council of Geraldton to compel the Owners and Occupiers of Sand-hill Allotments to plant the same with grass or shrubs.
	36 Vict. No. 11	30 August 1872
An Act to appropriate the sum of One Hundred and Four Thousand and Sixty-two Pounds Four Shillings and Tenpence (Note: £104,062 4s 10d in 1872 is equivalent to A$17,800,000 in 2022.) out of the General Revenue of the Colony for the Service of the year One thousand eight hundred and seventy-three.

== Sources ==
- "legislation.wa.gov.au".
