= List of acts of the Parliament of Western Australia from 2026 =

This is a list of acts of the Parliament of Western Australia for the year 2026.

== 2026 ==
Short title, or popular name	Citation	Royal assent
Long title
Tobacco Products Control Amendment Act 2026	No. 1 of 2026	17 March 2026
An Act to amend the Tobacco Products Control Act 2006 (Note: Tobacco Products Control Act 2006 (No. 5)) and to make a consequential amendment to the Misuse of Drugs Act 1981. (Note: Misuse of Drugs Act 1981 (No. 66))

== Sources ==
- "legislation.wa.gov.au".
