= List of acts of the Parliament of Western Australia from 1998 =

This is a list of acts of the Parliament of Western Australia for the year 1998.

== 1998 ==
Short title, or popular name	Citation	Royal assent
Long title
Government Railways (Access) Act 1998 or the Railways (Access) Act 1998	No. 49 of 1998	30 November 1998
An Act to promote competition in the operation of rail services by—: providing for the establishment of a Code governing the use of government railways for rail operations by persons other than the Western Australian Government Railways Commission; designating an official with monitoring, enforcement and administrative functions for the implementation of the Code; and; specifying the kind of administrative arrangements that the Commission is to have in place for the purposes of that implementation, to amend—: the Government Railways Act 1904 (Note: Government Railways Act 1904 (No. 23)) to make consequential amendments; and; the National Rail Corporation Agreement Act 1992, (Note: National Rail Corporation Agreement Act 1992 (No. 56)); and for related purposes.
Botanic Gardens and Parks Authority Act 1998	No. 53 of 1998	7 December 1998
An Act to make provision for—: the establishment of an Authority to control and manage King's Park and other land; the management policies to be followed by the Authority in relation to that land; the establishment of a Foundation with fund-raising and other functions; and; the dissolution of the King's Park Board, to consequentially amend certain Acts, and for related purposes.

== Sources ==
- "legislation.wa.gov.au".
