= List of ordinances of the Legislative Council of Western Australia from 1854 =

This is a list of ordinances of the Legislative Council of Western Australia for the year 1854.

== 1854 ==
Short title, or popular name	Citation	Royal assent
Long title
	17 Vict. No. 1	15 May 1854
An Ordinance further to define the Duties of Publicans.
	17 Vict. No. 2	15 May 1854
An Ordinance to explain and amend the 14th Vict., No 14, intituled "An Ordinance for Licensing Carts and Carriers." (Note: 14 Vict. No. 14)
	17 Vict. No. 3	15 May 1854
An Ordinance for further Regulating the Storage of Gunpowder.
Waterways Ordinance 1854	17 Vict. No. 4	15 May 1854
An Ordinance for the better Preservation of the Navigable Waters in Western Australia, and for the further Security of Life and Property thereon.
	17 Vict. No. 5	15 May 1854
An Ordinance to amend the Ordinance No. 18, of 1853. (Note: 16 Vict. No. 18) (16 Vic., No. 18.)
	17 Vict. No. 6	17 May 1854
An Ordinance to regulate the mode of awarding Compensations for Town Lands resumed by the Governor, on behalf of the Crown.
	17 Vict. No. 7	17 May 1854
An Ordinance for the Suppression of Violent Crimes committed by Convicts illegally at large.
	17 Vict. No. 8	17 May 1854
An Ordinance for the more effectual suppression of Drunkenness.
	17 Vict. No. 9	17 May 1854
An Ordinance to regulate Eating Houses and Boarding Houses.
Trustee Ordinance 1854	17 Vict. No. 10	20 June 1854
An Ordinance to consolidate and amend the Laws relating to the Conveyance and Transfer of Real and Personal Property vested in Trustees and Mortgagees.
	17 Vict. No. 11	20 May 1854
An Ordinance to naturalize the Reverend Martin Griver, the Reverend Venancio Garrido, and the Reverend Pedro Aragon.
Postage Stamp Ordinance 1854	17 Vict. No. 12	22 May 1854
An Ordinance to provide for, and regulate the issue, and use of Postage Stamps.
	17 Vict. No. 13	22 May 1854
An Ordinance to facilitate mutual Postal Communication between this Colony and other Countries.
	17 Vict. No. 14	27 May 1854
An Ordinance to repeal an Ordinance passed in the 12th year of the reign of Her present Majesty, No. 8, (Note: 12 Vict. No. 8) imposing duties on imported Goods, and to make other provisions in lieu thereof. (Repealed by 19 Vict. No. 14)
	17 Vict. No. 15	27 May 1854
An Ordinance to provide for an excess of Expenditure in the year 1853, over and above the Estimates for the same.
	17 Vict. No. 16	6 June 1854
An Ordinance to provide for the general Regulation of the Customs in Western Australia. (Repealed by Customs Ordinance 1860 (24 Vict. No. 5))
	17 Vict. No. 17	6 June 1854
An Ordinance to provide for the Preservation of Order in cases of any Discovery of Gold in Western Australia.
	17 Vict. No. 18	6 May 1854
An Ordinance to empower the Governor to raise £800, (Note: £800 in 1854 is equivalent to A$73,000 in 2022.) for the purchase of certain Building Allotments in the town of Perth.
	17 Vict. No. 19	9 June 1854
An Ordinance to provide for the payment of certain unforeseen Expenses during the year 1854, and also for the appropriation of the Revenue for the year 1855.

== Sources ==
- "legislation.wa.gov.au".
