= List of ordinances of the Legislative Council of Western Australia from 1862 =

This is a list of ordinances of the Legislative Council of Western Australia for the year 1862.

== 1862 ==
| Short title, or popular name | Citation | Royal assent |
Long title
| | 25 Vict. No. 16 | 9 June 1862 |
An Ordinance to confirm the Expenditure for the Services of the Year 1861 beyond the Grant for that Year.
| | 25 Vict. No. 17 | 9 June 1862 |
An Ordinance to appropriate and apply the Sum of Sixty Seven Thousand Eight Hundred and Three Pounds (Note: £67,803 in 1862 is equivalent to A$9,700,000 in 2022.) out of the general Revenue of the Colony for the Service of the Year 1863.
| | 25 Vict. No. 18 | 9 June 1862 |
An Ordinance to amend "The Jury Ordinance, 1858." (Note: Jury Ordinance 1858 (22 Vict. No. 7))
| | 25 Vict. No. 19 | 9 June 1862 |
An Ordinance to amend "An Ordinance for vesting the Ordnance Lands and Buildings in the Principal Secretary of State for the War Department." (Note: 25 Vict. No. 2)

== Sources ==
- "legislation.wa.gov.au".
