= List of ordinances of the Legislative Council of Western Australia from 1865 =

This is a list of ordinances of the Legislative Council of Western Australia for the year 1865.

== 1865 ==
Short title, or popular name	Citation	Royal assent
Long title
	29 Vict. No. 1	7 July 1865
An Ordinance to explain an Ordinance (Note: 27 Vict. No. 6) to regulate Friendly Societies.
	29 Vict. No. 2	7 July 1865
An Ordinance to amend An Ordinance (Note: 27 Vict. No. 14) to facilitate the sale of Colonial Wine.
Cattle Diseases Ordinance 1865	29 Vict. No. 3	7 July 1865
An Ordinance to prevent the introduction into Western Australia of infectious or contagious Diseases amongst Cattle.
Perth Carriage Fees Ordinance 1865	29 Vict. No. 4	7 July 1865
An Ordinance to impose certain Fees on Licenses for Carriages in the City of Perth.
Criminal Law Consolidation Ordinance 1865	29 Vict. No. 5	7 July 1865
An Ordinance to consolidate and amend the Statute Laws and Ordinances relating to Criminal Offences.
	29 Vict. No. 6	7 July 1865
An Ordinance to naturalize Isidro Oriol.
	29 Vict. No. 7	7 July 1865
An Ordinance to regulate the payment of Jurors serving in the Court of General Sessions at Albany.
Recovery of Debts Amendment Ordinance 1865	29 Vict. No. 8	7 July 1865
An Ordinance to explain and amend the Law for facilitating the Recovery of Debts.
	29 Vict. No. 9	7 July 1865
An Ordinance to regulate the admission in the Supreme Court of Attorneys and Solicitors, there to practise as Barristers, Attorneys, Solicitors, and Proctors.
	29 Vict. No. 10	7 July 1865
An Ordinance to confirm the expenditure for the services of the year 1864, beyond the grant for that year.
	29 Vict. No. 11	7 July 1865
An Ordinance to appropriate the sum of Seventy Six Thousand and Fifty Nine Pounds (Note: £76,059 in 1865 is equivalent to A$10,500,000 in 2022.) out of the General Revenue of the Colony, for the service of the year one thousand eight hundred and sixty-six.
Church of England Collegiate School Ordinance 1863 (repealed)	29 Vict. No. 12	18 August 1865
An Ordinance to incorporate the Governors of the Perth Church of England Collegiate School. (Repealed by Church of England Collegiate School Act 1885 (49 Vict. No. 19))
	29 Vict. No. 13	18 August 1865
An Ordinance to amend the Laws relating to the Post Office Savings Bank.

== Sources ==
- "legislation.wa.gov.au".
