= List of ordinances of the Legislative Council of Western Australia from 1857 =

This is a list of ordinances of the Legislative Council of Western Australia for the year 1857.

== 1857 ==
Short title, or popular name	Citation	Royal assent
Long title
	21 Vict. No. 1	22 June 1857
An Ordinance to make additional provisions for Convict Discipline in Western Australia.
	21 Vict. No. 2	22 June 1857
An Ordinance for securing a Pension to William Henry Mackie, (Note: William Mackie.) Esquire.
	21 Vict. No. 3	22 June 1857
An Ordinance to Provide additional Regulations for the Port of Fremantle.
	21 Vict. No. 4	22 June 1857
An Ordinance for narrowing Essex Street, in the Town of Fremantle, and for extending the Limits of certain Building Lots in that Town.
	21 Vict. No. 5	22 June 1857
An Ordinance to render more effectual an Ordinance, No. XV, 1844, called "An Act to prevent the spreading of the Infectious Disease called the Scab in Sheep in the Colony of Western Australia." (Note: 7 Vict. No. 15)
	21 Vict. No. 6	22 June 1857
An Ordinance to amend the "Public House Ordinance, 1856". (Note: Public House Ordinance 1856 (20 Vict. No. 1))
Cattle Trespass Ordinance 1857	21 Vict. No. 7	22 June 1857
An Ordinance to consolidate and amend the Laws relating to Trespasses by Live Stock, and to promote the construction of Fences.
	21 Vict. No. 8	22 June 1857
An Ordinance to give Legal Operation to Land Grants made to Deceased Persons.
	21 Vict. No. 9	22 June 1857
An Ordinance for the further Appropriation of the Revenue for the Year 1856, and for the General Appropriation of the Revenue for the Year 1858.
	21 Vict. No. 10	23 June 1857
An Ordinance for vesting Church of England Lands in Western Australia in the Bishop thereof, and his successors.
	21 Vict. No. 11	23 June 1857
An Ordinance to enable Trustees of Church of England Lands in Western Australia to raise money on security thereof in aid of the erection of Parsonage Houses. (Repealed by 38 Vict. No. 18)

== Sources ==
- "legislation.wa.gov.au".
