= List of ordinances of the Legislative Council of Western Australia from 1833 =

This is a list of ordinances of the Legislative Council of Western Australia for the year 1833.

== 1833 ==
Short title, or popular name	Citation	Royal assent
Long title
	3 Will. IV. No. 1	8 February 1833
An Act to enforce and regulate the performance of Quarantine in certain cases in Western Australia.
	3 Will. IV. No. 2	19 March 1833
An Act for the Regulation of Weights and Measures.
	3 Will. IV. No. 3	17 April 1833
An Act to enable the Governor, or other Officer administering the Government of Western Australia, to grant Exemptions from the payment of License Duty to Persons keeping Public Houses under special circumstances.
	4 Will. IV. No. 2 (Note: The act with citation 4 Will. IV. No. 1 was passed in 1834.)	30 December 1833
An Act to amend an Act, intituled "An Act to regulate the Sale of Spirituous and Fermented Liquors by Retail." (Note: 2 Will. IV. No. 8)
	4 Will. IV. No. 3	31 December 1833
An Act to Regulate the Licensing of Public Houses. (Repealed by 4 & 5 Vict. No. 8)

== Sources ==
- "legislation.wa.gov.au".
