= List of acts of the Legislative Council of Western Australia from 1874 =

This is a list of acts of the Legislative Council of Western Australia for the year 1874.

== 1874 ==
| Short title, or popular name | Citation | Royal assent |
Long title
| | 38 Vict. No. 1 | 17 July 1874 |
An Act to confirm the Expenditure for the services of the year One thousand eight hundred and seventy-three, beyond the grant for that year.
| | 38 Vict. No. 2 | 17 July 1874 |
An Act to amend the Ordinance 5th Victoria, No. 14, (Note: 4 & 5 Vict. No. 14) of 1841.
| Exportation of Horses Act 1874 | 38 Vict. No. 3 | 17 July 1874 |
An Act to regulate the Exportation of Horses.
| Game Act 1874 | 38 Vict. No. 4 | 17 July 1874 |
An Act to provide for the preservation of imported Game, and (during the Breeding Season) of Native Game.
| | 38 Vict. No. 5 | 17 July 1874 |
An Act to amend "The Elementary Education Act, 1871." (Note: Elementary Education Act 1871 (35 Vict. No. 14))
| Telegraphic Messages Act 1874 | 38 Vict. No. 6 | 17 July 1874 |
An Act to facilitate the proof of Telegraphic Messages in Courts of Justice, and for other purposes.
| | 38 Vict. No. 7 | 17 July 1874 |
An Act to amend the Land Transfer Duty Act. (Note: Land Transfer Duty Act 1841 (4 & 5 Vict. No. 13))
| | 38 Vict. No. 8 | 17 July 1874 |
An Act to amend "An Ordinance to provide for the summary trial and punishment of Aboriginal Native Offenders in certain cases." (Note: 12 Vict. No. 18)
| Imported Labor Registry Act 1874 (Note: The spelling 'Labor' is used in this act; it was popular in Australian English during this time.) (repealed) | 38 Vict. No. 9 | 17 July 1874 |
An Act to provide for the Registration of certain Persons who shall be imported into Western Australia, or employed in any manner within the Territorial Dominion thereof. (Repealed by Imported Labor Registry Act 1882 (46 Vict. No. 21))
| | 38 Vict. No. 10 | 6 August 1874 |
An Act further to amend the Post Office Savings' Bank Ordinance. (Note: Post Office Savings Bank Ordinance 1863 (27 Vict. No. 5))
| Industrial Schools' Act 1874 | 38 Vict. No. 11 | 6 August 1874 |
An Act to promote the efficiency of certain Charitable Institutions.
| Spanish Radish and Scotch Thistle Prevention Act 1874 | 38 Vict. No. 12 | 6 August 1874 |
An Act for preventing the further spread of the Spanish Radish and Scotch Thistle.
| Transfer of Land Act 1874 | 38 Vict. No. 13 | 6 August 1874 |
An Act to simplify the Title to and the dealing with Estates in Land.
| | 38 Vict. No. 14 | 6 August 1874 |
An Act to extend the Powers of the Perth City Council.
| Wines, Beer, and Spirit Sale Amendment Act 1874 | 38 Vict. No. 15 | 6 August 1874 |
An Act to amend "The Wines, Beer, and Spirit Sale Act, 1872." (Note: Wines, Beer, and Spirit Sale Act 1872 (36 Vict. No. 5))
| Foreign Recruiting Act 1874 | 38 Vict. No. 16 | 27 November 1874 |
An Act to control Recruiting in Western Australia for the service of Foreign States.
| | 38 Vict. No. 17 | 27 November 1874 |
An Act to appropriate the sum of One Hundred and Fifty-two Thousand One Hundred and Sixteen Pounds Eight Shillings and Twopence (Note: £152,116 8s 2d in 1874 is equivalent to A$23,400,000 in 2022.) out of the Revenue of the Colony for the Service of the year One thousand eight hundred and seventy-five.
| | 38 Vict. No. 18 | 27 November 1874 |
An Act for the Incorporation of the Standing Committee of the Diocesan Synod of Perth as Trustees of the Branch of the Church of England in Western Australia. (Repealed by Church of England (Diocesan Trustees) Act 1888 (52 Vict. No. 2))

== Sources ==
- "legislation.wa.gov.au".
