= List of acts of the Parliament of Western Australia from 1908 =

This is a list of acts of the Parliament of Western Australia for the year 1908.

== 1908 ==
Short title, or popular name	Citation	Royal assent
Long title
	No. 1 of 1908	12 August 1908
An Act to apply out of the Consolidated Revenue Fund the sum of Eight Hundred and Thirty-two Thousand Six Hundred and Eighty-four, Pounds, and from Moneys to Credit of the General Loan Fund the sum of Two Hundred and Thirty-three Thousand Two Hundred and Eighty-three Pounds, to the Service of the Year ending 30th June, 1909.
Presbyterian Church Act 1908	No. 2 of 1908	12 August 1908
An Act to repeal the Law relating to the Management of the Real and Personal Estate of the Presbyterian Church in the State of Western Australia, and to make other provisions in lieu thereof
	No. 3 of 1908	12 August 1908
An Act to validate certain Rates made by the Council of the Municipality of Claremont and the Claremont Local Board of Health for the year ending the thirty-first day of October, 1908.
	No. 4 of 1908	15 December 1908
An Act to apply out of the Consolidated Revenue Fund and from Moneys to Credit of the General Loan Fund the sum of Three Hundred and Sixty-five Thousand Five Hundred and Seventy-nine Pounds to the Service of the Year ending 30th June, 1909.
Land Tax and Income Tax Act 1908	No. 5 of 1908	18 December 1908
An Act to impose a Land Tax and all Income Tax.

== Sources ==
- "legislation.wa.gov.au".
