= List of ordinances of the Legislative Council of Western Australia from 1866 =

This is a list of ordinances of the Legislative Council of Western Australia for the year 1866.

== 1866 ==
Short title, or popular name	Citation	Royal assent
Long title
	30 Vict. No. 1	2 July 1866
An Ordinance to prevent doubts as to the application of the Statutes of Usury and to limit and define the Rate of Interest which may be recovered in Cases where it hath not been previously agreed on between the parties.
	30 Vict. No. 2	9 July 1866
An Ordinance to naturalize August Bothe.
	30 Vict. No. 3	9 July 1866
An Ordinance to naturalize Bartolomi Ramis.
	30 Vict. No. 4	9 July 1866
An Ordinance for securing to John Morgan, for a limited period, the exclusive benefit of a certain Invention.
	30 Vict. No. 5	9 July 1866
An Ordinance to give a preferable lien on Wool, from season to season, and to render Mortgages of Sheep, Cattle, and Horses valid, without delivery to the Mortgagee.
	30 Vict. No. 6	9 July 1866
An Ordinance to amend the Ordinances relating to Trespasses by live stock.
	30 Vict. No. 7	9 July 1866
An Ordinance to confirm the Expenditure for the services of the year One thousand eight hundred and sixty-five, beyond the grant for that year.
	30 Vict. No. 8	9 July 1866
An Ordinance to appropriate the sum of Eighty Two Thousand and Forty Five pounds (Note: £82,045 in 1866 is equivalent to A$10,700,000 in 2022.) out of the General Revenue of the Colony, for the Service of the year one thousand eight hundred and sixty seven.
	30 Vict. No. 9	19 July 1866
An Ordinance to incorporate The National Bank of Australasia; and for other purposes.
	30 Vict. No. 10	25 September 1866
An Ordinance to regulate the Police Benefit Fund.
	30 Vict. No. 11	25 September 1866
An Ordinance to enable the Trustees of the Freemasons' Lodge of St. John, No. 485, to grant a mortgage on the 'Perth Building Lot B 15.'
Passenger by Land Ordinance 1866	30 Vict. No. 12	25 September 1866
An Ordinance further to regulate Public Conveyances, carrying Passengers for hire, and to prevent the ill-treatment of Horses and Cattle.
Scab in Sheep Ordinance 1866 (repealed)	30 Vict. No. 13	17 December 1866
An Ordinance for the prevention and cure of Scab in Sheep. (Repealed by Scab Act 1879 (43 Vict. No. 16))
	30 Vict. No. 14	17 December 1866
An Ordinance to reduce the duty on the importation of unmanufactured Tobacco.

== Sources ==
- "legislation.wa.gov.au".
