= Lists of acts of Australia =

This is a partial list of lists of acts of Australia.

== General list ==
- List of acts of the Parliament of Australia from 1901
- List of acts of the Parliament of Australia from 1902
- List of acts of the Parliament of Australia from 1903
- List of acts of the Parliament of Australia from 1904
- List of acts of the Parliament of Australia from 1905
- List of acts of the Parliament of Australia from 1906
- List of acts of the Parliament of Australia from 1907
- List of acts of the Parliament of Australia from 1908
- List of acts of the Parliament of Australia from 1909
- List of acts of the Parliament of Australia from 1910

== New South Wales ==
- List of acts of the Parliament of New South Wales from 1824
- List of acts of the Parliament of New South Wales from 1825
- List of acts of the Parliament of New South Wales from 1826

== Northern Territory ==
- List of acts of the Legislative Assembly of the Northern Territory from 1978
- List of acts of the Legislative Assembly of the Northern Territory from 1989
- List of acts of the Legislative Assembly of the Northern Territory from 1995
- List of acts of the Legislative Assembly of the Northern Territory from 2005
- List of acts of the Legislative Assembly of the Northern Territory from 2019
- List of acts of the Legislative Assembly of the Northern Territory from 2025
- List of acts of the Legislative Assembly of the Northern Territory from 2026

== Queensland ==
- List of acts of the Parliament of Queensland from 1860

== South Australia ==
- List of acts of the Parliament of South Australia from 1837
- List of acts of the Parliament of South Australia from 1838
- List of acts of the Parliament of South Australia from 1839

== Victoria ==
=== 19th century ===
- List of acts of the Legislative Council of Victoria from 1851 (15 Vict. Nos. 1-8)
- List of acts of the Legislative Council of Victoria from 1852 (15 Vict. Nos. 9-15; 16 Vict. Nos. 1-23)
- List of acts of the Legislative Council of Victoria from 1853 (16 Vict. Nos. 24-40; 17 Vict. Nos. 1-5)
- List of acts of the Legislative Council of Victoria from 1854 (17 Vict. Nos. 7-31; 18 Vict. Nos. 1-15)
- List of acts of the Legislative Council of Victoria from 1855 (18 Vict. Nos. 16-44; 19 Vict. No. 1)
- List of acts of the Legislative Council of Victoria from 1856 (19 Vict. Nos. 2-21)
- List of acts of the Parliament of Victoria from 1857 (Nos. 1-44)
- List of acts of the Parliament of Victoria from 1858 (Nos. 45-65)
- List of acts of the Parliament of Victoria from 1859 (Nos. 66-91)
- List of acts of the Parliament of Victoria from 1860 (Nos. 92-119)
- List of acts of the Parliament of Victoria from 1861 (Nos. 120-130)
- List of acts of the Parliament of Victoria from 1862 (Nos. 131-162)
- List of acts of the Parliament of Victoria from 1863 (Nos. 163-189)
- List of acts of the Parliament of Victoria from 1864 (Nos. 188-233)
- List of acts of the Parliament of Victoria from 1865 (Nos. 234-293)
- List of acts of the Parliament of Victoria from 1866 (Nos. 294-301)
- List of acts of the Parliament of Victoria from 1867 (Nos. 302-326)
- List of acts of the Parliament of Victoria from 1868 (Nos. 327-335)
- List of acts of the Parliament of Victoria from 1869 (Nos. 336-360)
- List of acts of the Parliament of Victoria from 1870 (Nos. 361-390)
- List of acts of the Parliament of Victoria from 1872 (Nos. 419-447)
- List of acts of the Parliament of Victoria from 1878 (Nos. 597-634)
- List of acts of the Parliament of Victoria from 1884 (Nos. 788-828)
- List of acts of the Parliament of Victoria from 1886 (Nos. 877-912)
- List of acts of the Parliament of Victoria from 1887 (Nos. 917-958)
- List of acts of the Parliament of Victoria from 1888 (Nos. 964-1006)

=== 20th century ===
From 1986, acts were numbered within each calendar year.

- List of acts of the Parliament of Victoria from 1900 (Nos. 1628-1715)
- List of acts of the Parliament of Victoria from 1901 (Nos. 1723-1776)
- List of acts of the Parliament of Victoria from 1908 (Nos. 2139-2156)
- List of acts of the Parliament of Victoria from 1922
- List of acts of the Parliament of Victoria from 1958
- List of acts of the Parliament of Victoria from 1978
- List of acts of the Parliament of Victoria from 1981 (Nos. 9713)
- List of acts of the Parliament of Victoria from 1983 (Nos. 9921-10027)
- List of acts of the Parliament of Victoria from 1985 (Nos. 10190-10214)
- List of acts of the Parliament of Victoria from 1986
- List of acts of the Parliament of Victoria from 1987
- List of acts of the Parliament of Victoria from 1988
- List of acts of the Parliament of Victoria from 1995

=== 21st century ===
- List of acts of the Parliament of Victoria from 2001
- List of acts of the Parliament of Victoria from 2002
- List of acts of the Parliament of Victoria from 2004
- List of acts of the Parliament of Victoria from 2006
- List of acts of the Parliament of Victoria from 2007
- List of acts of the Parliament of Victoria from 2008
- List of acts of the Parliament of Victoria from 2009
- List of acts of the Parliament of Victoria from 2010
- List of acts of the Parliament of Victoria from 2011
- List of acts of the Parliament of Victoria from 2020
- List of acts of the Parliament of Victoria from 2025
- List of acts of the Parliament of Victoria from 2026

== Western Australia ==
The Legislative Council of Western Australia was created in 1832 as an appointed body. It had powers under the Government of Western Australia Act 1829 (10 Geo. 4. c. 22 (Imp)) to make ordinances for the colony. Initially the powers were granted for just a couple of years, but were successively extended by the Western Australia Government Act 1835 (5 & 6 Will. 4. c. 14 (Imp)), the Western Australia Government Act 1836, the Western Australia Government Act 1838. The Government of Western Australia Act 1829 was extended further by the Western Australia Government Act 1841, the Western Australia Government Act 1842 and the Western Australia Government Act 1846. In 1871 the Legislative Council became an elected body under the terms of the Australian Constitutions Act 1850 (13 & 14 Vict. c. 59 (Imp)). No acts were passed in 1890. In 1891 the Constitution Act 1889 (52 Vict. No. 23) took effect: the Legislative Assembly joined the Legislative Council, and the Parliament of Western Australia was formed. In 1901, Western Australia became a state within the new federal Commonwealth of Australia.

=== 19th century ===
- 1830s: 1832 (2 Will. IV)
- 1833 (3 Will. IV; 4 Will. IV. Nos. 2-3)
- 1834 (4 Will. IV. Nos. 1, 4-5; 5 Will. IV. Nos. 1-5)
- 1835 (5 Will. IV. No. 6)
- 1836 (6 Will. IV)
- 1837 (7 Will. IV)
- 1838 (1 Vict.)
- 1839 (2 Vict.; 3 Vict.)
- 1840s: 1840 (4 Vict.)
- 1841 (4 & 5 Vict.)
- 1842 (6 Vict.)
- 1843 (7 Vict. Nos. 1-10)
- 1844 (7 Vict. Nos. 11-16; 8 Vict. Nos. 1-10)
- 1845 (8 Vict. Nos. 11-12; 9 Vict. Nos. 1-6)
- 1846 (9 Vict. Nos. 7-11)
- 1847 (10 Vict. Nos. 1-20)
- 1848 (10 Vict. No. 21; 12 Vict. Nos. 1-5)
- 1849 (12 Vict. Nos. 6-25; 13 Vict. No. 1)
- 1850s: 1850 (13 Vict. No. 2; 14 Vict. Nos. 1-16)
- 1851 (14 Vict. Nos. 17-26; 15 Vict. Nos. 1-4)
- 1852 (15 Vict. Nos. 5-9; 16 Vict. Nos. 1-10)
- 1853 (16 Vict. Nos. 11-23)
- 1854 (17 Vict.)
- 1855 (18 Vict.; 19 Vict. Nos. 1-2)
- 1856 (19 Vict. Nos. 3-16; 20 Vict.)
- 1857 (21 Vict. Nos. 1-11)
- 1858 (21 Vict. No. 12; 22 Vict.)
- 1859 (23 Vict. Nos. 1-12)
- 1860s: 1860 (23 Vict. Nos. 13-14; 24 Vict. Nos. 1-14)
- 1861 (24 Vict. Nos. 15-16; 25 Vict. Nos. 1-15)
- 1862 (25 Vict. Nos. 16-19)
- 1863 (27 Vict.)
- 1864 (28 Vict.)
- 1865 (29 Vict.)
- 1866 (30 Vict.)
- 1867 (31 Vict.)
- 1868 (32 Vict.)
- 1869 (33 Vict. Nos. 1-12)
- 1870s: 1870 (33 Vict. Nos. 13-15)
- 1871 (34 Vict.; 35 Vict.)
- 1872 (36 Vict.)
- 1873 (37 Vict.)
- 1874 (38 Vict.)
- 1875 (39 Vict. Nos. 1-18)
- 1876 (39 Vict. Nos. 19-21; 40 Vict.)
- 1877 (41 Vict.)
- 1878 (42 Vict. Nos. 1-31)
- 1879 (42 Vict. Nos. 32-33; 43 Vict.)
- 1880s: 1880 (44 Vict. Nos. 1-14)
- 1881 (44 Vict. Nos. 15-23; 45 Vict.; 46 Vict. Nos. 1-3)
- 1882 (46 Vict. Nos. 4-25)
- 1883 (46 Vict. No. 26; 47 Vict.)
- 1884 (48 Vict.)
- 1885 (49 Vict.)
- 1886 (50 Vict.)
- 1887 (51 Vict. Nos. 1-21)
- 1888 (51 Vict. Nos. 22-32; 52 Vict. Nos. 1-21)
- 1889 (52 Vict. Nos. 22-24; 53 Vict.)
- 1890s: 1891 (54 Vict.)
- 1892 (55 Vict.)
- 1893 (56 Vict.; 57 Vict.)
- 1894 (58 Vict.)
- 1895 (59 Vict.)
- 1896 (60 Vict. Nos. 1-44)
- 1897 (60 Vict. Nos. 45-46; 61 Vict.)
- 1898 (62 Vict.)
- 1899 (63 Vict. Nos. 1-54)

=== 20th century ===
- 1900
- 1901
- 1902
- 1903
- 1904
- 1905
- 1906
- 1907
- 1908
- 1909
- 1910
- 1911
- 1912
- 1914
- 1919
- 1920
- 1922
- 1923
- 1924
- 1925
- 1926
- 1927
- 1928
- 1930
- 1933
- 1934
- 1935
- 1936
- 1937
- 1938
- 1939
- 1944
- 1945
- 1946
- 1947
- 1948
- 1950
- 1951
- 1952
- 1953
- 1957
- 1959
- 1963
- 1964
- 1965
- 1966
- 1967
- 1968
- 1969
- 1970
- 1971
- 1972
- 1973
- 1974
- 1979
- 1983
- 1984
- 1985
- 1986
- 1987
- 1988
- 1989
- 1990
- 1991
- 1992
- 1993
- 1995
- 1997
- 1998

=== 21st century ===
- 2000
- 2001
- 2002
- 2003
- 2004
- 2005
- 2006
- 2010
- 2011
- 2015
- 2016
- 2020
- 2021
- 2025
- 2026

== See also ==
- Parliament of Australia
- Parliaments of the Australian states and territories
