= List of ordinances of the Legislative Council of Western Australia from 1870 =

This is a list of ordinances of the Legislative Council of Western Australia for the year 1870.

== 1870 ==
Short title, or popular name	Citation	Royal assent
Long title
	33 Vict. No. 13	1 June 1870
An Ordinance to provide for the establishment of a Legislative Council, the division of the Colony into Electoral Districts, and the election of Members to serve in such Council.
	33 Vict. No. 14	1 June 1870
An Ordinance to Naturalize Bernard Martinez.
	33 Vict. No. 15	1 June 1870
An Ordinance to confirm the Expenditure for the services of the year One thousand eight hundred and sixty-nine, beyond the grant for that year. (Repealed by Statute Law Revision Act 1964 (13 Eliz. II. No. 61))

== Sources ==
- "legislation.wa.gov.au".
