= List of acts of the Parliament of Western Australia from 1973 =

This is a list of acts of the Parliament of Western Australia for the year 1973.

== 1973 ==
Short title, or popular name	Citation	Royal assent
Long title
Mining Act Amendment Act 1973	No. 1 of 1973	15 May 1973
An Act to amend the Mining Act, 1904-1971. (Note: Mining Act 1904 (No. 15))
Railway (Coogee–Kwinana Railway) Discontinuance Act 1973	No. 24 of 1973	6 June 1973
An Act to authorize the Discontinuance of portion of the Coogee–Kwinana Railway and for incidental purposes.
Railway (Kalgoorlie–Parkeston) Discontinuance and Land Revestment Act 1973	No. 48 of 1973	6 November 1973
An Act to Authorize the Discontinuance of the Kalgoorlie–Parkeston Railway and to Revest in Her Majesty certain land comprised therein, and for incidental and other purposes.
Alumina Refinery (Worsley) Agreement Act 1973	No. 67 of 1973	28 November 1973
An Act to authorize the execution on behalf of the State of an Agreement with Alwest Pty. Limited and Dampier Mining Company Limited relating to the establishment at or near Worsley of a refinery to produce alumina and for incidental and other purposes.
Railway (Bunbury to Boyanup) Discontinuance, Revestment and Construction Act 1973	No. 71 of 1973	6 December 1973
An Act to Authorize the Discontinuance of portion of the railway from Sunbury to Boyanup and to Revest in Her Majesty certain land comprised therein, to Authorize the Construction of a portion of railway between Sunbury and Boyanup and for incidental purposes.
Metropolitan (Perth) Passenger Transport Trust Act Amendment Act 1973	No. 93 of 1973	27 December 1973
An Act to amend the Metropolitan (Perth) Passenger Transport Trust Act, 1957-1966. (Note: Metropolitan (Perth) Passenger Transport Trust Act 1957 (No. 71))
Government Railways Act Amendment Act 1973	No. 94 of 1973	27 December 1973
An Act to amend the Government Railways Act, 1904-1973. (Note: Government Railways Act 1904 (No. 23))
	No. X of 1973	
Loan Act 1973	No. 112 of 1973	4 January 1974
An Act to authorise the raising of a sum of Sixty-six Million and One Hundred Thousand Dollars by loan for the construction of certain Public Works and for Other Purposes.

== Sources ==
- "legislation.wa.gov.au".
