= List of ordinances of the Legislative Council of Western Australia from 1848 =

This is a list of ordinances of the Legislative Council of Western Australia for the year 1848.

== 1848 ==
Short title, or popular name	Citation	Royal assent
Long title
	10 Vict. No. 21	31 March 1848
An Ordinance for applying certain Sums arising from the Revenue receivable in the Colony of Western Australia to the service thereof, for the Financial Year commencing First of April, One thousand eight hundred and forty-seven; and for the further appropriating the said Revenue. (Repealed by Statute Law Revision Act 1964 (13 Eliz. II. No. 61))
	12 Vict. No. 1	20 July 1848
An Ordinance for applying certain sums arising from the Revenue receivable in the Colony of Western Australia, to the service thereof, for the Financial Year commencing First April, one thousand eight hundred and forty-nine. (Repealed by Statute Law Revision Act 1964 (13 Eliz. II. No. 61))
	12 Vict. No. 2	20 July 1848
An Ordinance to make perpetual an Ordinance intituled "An Ordinance to make provision for the Trial of Criminal Offences at Albany and other remote Districts of the Colony of Western Australia." (Note: 9 Vict. No. 4)
	12 Vict. No. 3	20 July 1848
An Ordinance to make perpetual an Ordinance, intituled "An Ordinance to regulate the constitution of Juries for the trial of criminal offences in Albany and other remote districts in the Colony of Western Australia, and to limit the right of Challenge to some extent in certain cases." (Note: 9 Vict. No. 5)
	12 Vict. No. 4	25 July 1848
An Ordinance for taking an account of the Population and of the amount of Live Stock and Crop and other Particulars of the Colony of Western Australia.
	12 Vict. No. 5	27 July 1848
Supplementary Ordinance for applying certain sums arising from the Revenue receivable in the Colony of Western Australia, to the service thereof, for the Financial Year commencing First April, one thousand eight hundred and forty-eight. (Repealed by Statute Law Revision Act 1964 (13 Eliz. II. No. 61))

== Sources ==
- "legislation.wa.gov.au".
