= List of acts of the Legislative Council of Victoria from 1852 =

This is a list of acts of the Legislative Council of Victoria, Australia for the year 1852.

== 1852 ==
Short title, or popular name	Citation	Royal assent
Long title
	15 Vict. No. 9	6 January 1852
An Act to amend the Law for the Conveyance and Postage of Letters. (Repealed by Postage Act 1854 (17 Vict. No. 30))
	15 Vict. No. 10	6 January 1852
An Act to make provision for the better Administration of Justice in the Colony of Victoria. (Repealed by Supreme Court Act 1890 (54 Vict. No. 1142))
	15 Vict. No. 11	6 January 1852
An Act to further amend the Laws relating to the Savings' Bank of Port Phillip, and to empower the Vice President and the Trustees thereof to lend money by way of mortgage to the Corporations of the City of Melbourne and Town of Geelong respectively. (Repealed by 16 Vict. No. 37)
	15 Vict. No. 12	6 January 1852
An Act to restrain the Practice of Gambling and the use of Obscene Language. (Repealed by 16 Vict. No. 22)
	15 Vict. No. 13	6 January 1852
An Act to enable the Lieutenant Governor of the Colony of Victoria to appoint a Chairman of and also a Crown Prosecutor, at General and Quarter Sessions. (Repealed by 16 Vict. No. 3)
	15 Vict. No. 14	6 January 1852
An Act to amend for a limited time an Act, intituled, "An Act to consolidate and amend the Laws relating to the Licensing of Public-houses, and to regulate the Sale of Fermented and Spirituous Liquors in New South Wales." (Note: 13 Vict. No. 29 (NSW)) (Repealed by 16 Vict. No. 35)
	15 Vict. No. 15	6 January 1852
An Act to restrain by summary Proceeding unauthorised Mining on Waste Lands of the Crown. (Repealed by 17 Vict. No. 4)
	16 Vict. No. 1	27 July 1852
An Act to confirm the adoption and use of a Seal, as the Seal of the Colony of Victoria, and to indemnify all persons acting by authority of the same. (Repealed by Constitution Act Amendment Act 1890 (54 Vict. No. 1075))
	16 Vict. No. 2	
An Act for granting Duties of Customs in colony of Victoria. (Repealed by 17 Vict. No. 6)
	16 Vict. No. 3	3 September 1852
An Act to make provision for the better Administration of Justice in Courts of General Sessions in the Colony of Victoria. (Repealed by Justices of the Peace Statute 1865 (28 Vict. No. 267))
	16 Vict. No. 4	7 September 1852
An Act to enable Immigration Boards to make certain Enquiries relating to Immigrant Ships. (Repealed by Immigration Statute 1864 (27 Vict. No. 195)
	16 Vict. No. 5	14 September 1852
An Act to enable the Supreme Court of Victoria to compel Taxation of Attorneys' Bills of Costs in Criminal Cases in the Supreme Court of Victoria. (Repealed by Criminal Law and Practice Statute 1864 (27 Vict. No. 233))
	16 Vict. No. 6	14 September 1852
An Act to amend and continue two Acts passed in the ninth and eleventh Years of the Reign of Her present Majesty, respectively intituled "An Act to amend and consolidate the Laws between Masters and Servants in New South Wales," (Note: 9 Vict. No. 27 (NSW)) and "An Act to amend an Act intituled 'An Act to amend and consolidate the Laws between Masters and Servants in New South Wales.'" (Note: 11 Vict. No. 9 (NSW)) (Repealed by Masters and Servants Statute 1864 (27 Vict. No. 198))
	16 Vict. No. 7	15 September 1852
An Act for improving the Administration of Criminal Justice. (Repealed by Coroners Statute 1865 (28 Vict. No. 253))
	16 Vict. No. 8	17 September 1852
An Act to make further provision for the Care and Maintenance of Persons of Unsound Mind. (Repealed by Lunacy Statute 1867 (31 Vict. No. 309))
	16 Vict. No. 9	17 September 1852
An Act to amend the Law of Evidence. (Repealed by 21 Vict. No. 8)
	16 Vict. No. 10	21 September 1852
An Act to amend an Act intituled "An Act declaratory of the right of Occupants of Crown Lands to impound Cattle and other Animals found trespassing thereon." (Note: 14 Vict. No. 42 (NSW)) (Repealed by 18 Vict. No. 30)
County Courts Act 1852 (repealed)	16 Vict. No. 11	23 September 1852
An Act to make provision for the better Administration of Justice in County Courts in the Colony of Victoria. (Repealed by 21 Vict. No. 29)
	16 Vict. No. 12	23 September 1852
An Act to consolidate and amend the Law relating to Ports, Harbours, and Shipping in the Colony of Victoria. (Repealed by Passengers Harbors and Navigation Statute 1865 (28 Vict. No. 255))
	16 Vict. No. 13	23 September 1852
An Act to facilitate the apprehension and prevent the introduction into the Colony of Victoria of Offenders illegally at large.
	16 Vict. No. 14	23 September 1852
An Act for the better prevention of Offences. (Repealed by Criminal Law and Practice Statute 1864 (27 Vict. No. 233))
	16 Vict. No. 15	29 November 1852
An Act to alter the Laws relative to Jurors and Juries in certain Districts. (Repealed by 21 Vict. No. 19)
	16 Vict. No. 16	30 November 1852
An Act to amend the Laws relating to Special Constables. (Repealed by Unlawful Assemblies and Party Processions Statute 1865 (28 Vict. No. 247))
	16 Vict. No. 17	30 November 1852
An Act to regulate the Conveyance of Passengers to the Colony of Victoria. (Repealed by 18 Vict. No. 5)
Malbourne Corporation Act Amendment Act 1852	16 Vict. No. 18	3 December 1852
An Act to amend "The Melbourne Corporation Act" (Note: Melbourne Corporation Act 1842 (6 Vict. No. 7 (NSW))) in the matter of the qualification of Citizenship.
Change of Common Seal Act 1852	16 Vict. No. 19	3 December 1852
An Act to authorise the Corporation of the City of Melbourne to damask and destroy their Common Seal, and to adopt another Seal in lieu thereof.
	16 Vict. No. 20	29 December 1852
An Act for the better protection of Cattle and the better prevention of Cattle Stealing. (Repealed by Police Offences Statute 1865 (28 Vict. No. 265))
	16 Vict. No. 21	29 December 1852
An Act for Preventing the Extension of the Disease called Scab in Sheep. (Repealed by 18 Vict. No. 38)
Vagrant Act 1852 (repealed)	16 Vict. No. 22	29 December 1852
An Act for the better prevention of Vagrancy and other Offences. (Repealed by Police Offences Statute 1864 (27 Vict. No. 225))
	16 Vict. No. 23	31 December 1852
An Act for the General Regulation of the Customs in the Colony of Victoria. (Repealed by 21 Vict. No. 13)

== Sources ==
- "1852 Victorian Historical Acts". AustLII.
