= List of acts of the Parliament of Australia from 1903 =

This is a list of acts of the Parliament of Australia for the year 1903.

== 1903 ==
Short title, or popular name	Citation	Royal assent
Long title
Supply Act (No. 1) 1903-4 (repealed)	No. 1 of 1903	4 July 1903
An Act to grant and apply out of the Consolidated Revenue Fund a sum for the service of the year ending the thirtieth day of June One thousand nine hundred and four.
Senate Elections Act 1903 (repealed)	No. 2 of 1903	15 July 1903
An Act to make further provision for the Election of Senators.
Sugar Rebate Abolition Act 1903 (repealed)	No. 3 of 1903	30 July 1903
An Act to abolish the Rebate of Excise Duty on Sugar.
Sugar Bounty Act 1903 (repealed)	No. 4 of 1903	30 July 1903
An Act to provide for a Bounty to Growers of Sugar-Cane and Beet.
Supply Act (No. 2) 1903-4 (repealed)	No. 5 of 1903	30 July 1903
An Act to grant and apply out of the Consolidated Revenue Fund a sum for the Service of the year ending the thirtieth day of June One thousand nine hundred and four.
Judiciary Act 1903	No. 6 of 1903	25 August 1903
An Act to make provision for the Exercise of the Judicial Power of the Commonwealth.
High Court Procedure Act 1903 (repealed)	No. 7 of 1903	28 August 1903
An Act to regulate the Practice and Procedure of the High Court.
Naval Agreement Act 1903 (repealed)	No. 8 of 1903	28 August 1903
An Act to approve of an Agreement relating to the Naval Force on the Australian Station entered into by the Commissioners for executing the office of Lord High Admiral of the United Kingdom and the Governments of the Commonwealth and of New Zealand and to appropriate moneys for the purposes of that Agreement.
Electoral Divisions Act 1903 (repealed)	No. 9 of 1903	11 September 1903
An Act relating to Elections.
Supply Act (No. 3) 1903-4 (repealed)	No. 10 of 1903	29 September 1903
An Act to grant and apply out of the Consolidated Revenue Fund a sum for the service of the year ending the thirtieth day of June One thousand nine hundred and four.
Naturalization Act 1903 (repealed)	No. 11 of 1903	13 October 1903
An Act relating to Naturalization.
Extradition Act 1903 (repealed)	No. 12 of 1903	21 October 1903
An Act relating to Extradition.
High Court Procedure Amendment Act 1903 (repealed)	No. 13 of 1903	21 October 1903
An Act to amend the High Court Procedure Act 1903. (Note: High Court Procedure Act 1903 (No. 7))
Appropriation Act 1903-4 (repealed)	No. 14 of 1903	22 October 1903
An Act to grant and apply a sum out of the Consolidated Revenue Fund to the service of the year ending the thirtieth day of June One thousand nine hundred and four and to appropriate the supplies granted for such year in this session of the Parliament.
Supplementary Appropriation Act 1901-2 and 1902-3 (repealed)	No. 15 of 1903	22 October 1903
An Act to grant and apply out of the Consolidated Revenue Fund a further sum for the service of the year ended the thirtieth day of June One thousand nine hundred and two and a further sum for the service of the year ended the thirtieth day of June One thousand nine hundred and three.
Appropriation (Works and Buildings) Act 1903-4 (repealed)	No. 16 of 1903	22 October 1903
An Act to grant and apply a sum out of the Consolidated Revenue Fund to the service of the year ending the thirtieth day of June One thousand nine hundred and four for the purposes of Additions, New Works, and Buildings.
Supplementary Appropriation (Works and Buildings) Act 1901-2 and 1902-3 (repealed)	No. 17 of 1903	22 October 1903
An Act to grant and apply out of the Consolidated Revenue Fund for Additions, New Works, and Buildings a further sum for the service of the year ended the thirtieth day of June One thousand nine hundred and two and a further sum for the service of the year ended the thirtieth day of June One thousand nine hundred and three.
Statutory Rules Publication Act 1903 (repealed)	No. 18 of 1903	22 October 1903
An Act for the Publication of Statutory Rules.
Commonwealth Public Service Amendment Act 1903 (repealed)	No. 19 of 1903	22 October 1903
An Act to amend the Commonwealth Public Service Act 1902. (Note: Commonwealth Public Service Act 1902 (No. 5))
Defence Act 1903	No. 20 of 1903	22 October 1903
An Act to provide for the Naval and Military Defence and Protection of the Commonwealth and of the several States.
Patents Act 1903 (repealed)	No. 21 of 1903	22 October 1903
An Act relating to Patents of Inventions.

== Sources ==
- "legislation.gov.au".
