= List of ordinances of the Legislative Council of Western Australia from 1839 =

This is a list of ordinances of the Legislative Council of Western Australia for the year 1839.

== 1839 ==
Short title, or popular name	Citation	Royal assent
Long title
Imperial Acts Adopting Act 1839	2 Vict. No. 1	4 April 1839
An Act for adopting and applying certain Acts of the Parliament of the United Kingdom passed in the first year of the Reign of Her present Majesty in the Colony of Western Australia, in like manner as other Laws of England are applied therein.
	2 Vict. No. 2	4 April 1839
An Act to amend an Act intituled "An Act to impose certain Duties on Imported Spirituous Liquors." (Note: 5 Will. IV. No. 3)
	2 Vict. No. 3	4 April 1839
An Act for the Regulation of the Customs of Western Australia.
	2 Vict. No. 4	4 April 1839
An Act to amend an Act intituled "An Act to regulate the Sale of Spirituous and Fermented Liquors by retail," and for the issuing of certain Licenses connected therewith.
	2 Vict. No. 5	4 April 1839
An Act to enable the Inhabitants of any Township to assess themselves for the Improvement of the Town.
	2 Vict. No. 6	4 April 1839
An Act for appointing and authorising certain persons to be Commissioners and to act as Guardians to Emigrants, being Minors, sent to this Colony from the United Kingdom by a Society known by the style of "The Children's Friend Society."
	2 Vict. No. 7	1 May 1839
An Act to amend an Act (Note: 2 Will. IV. No. 9) for the Regulation of Pilotage and Shipping in the Harbours of Western Australia.
	2 Vict. No. 8	1 May 1839
An Act for applying certain Sums arising from the Revenue receivable in the Colony of Western Australia to the Service thereof for the Financial Year commencing the first of April, One Thousand Eight Hundred and Forty. (Repealed by Statute Law Revision Act 1964 (13 Eliz. II. No. 61))
	2 Vict. No. 9	1 May 1839
An Act to amend an Act intituled "An Act to regulate the Establishment of Banking Companies in the Colony of Western Australia; and to enable the Proprietors of such Companies to sue and be sued in the name of any one of their Public Officers." (Note: 7 Will. IV. No. 3)
	3 Vict. No. 1	28 October 1839
An Act to regulate the Licensing of Auctioneers, and the collection of Duties on Property sold by Auction.
	3 Vict. No. 2	28 October 1839
An Act to provide a remedy against Horses and other Live Stock straying in Towns, and to prevent Entire Horses and Bulls straying in any part Of the Colony.

== Sources ==
- "legislation.wa.gov.au".
