= List of ordinances of the Legislative Council of Western Australia from 1861 =

This is a list of ordinances of the Legislative Council of Western Australia for the year 1861.

== 1861 ==
Short title, or popular name	Citation	Royal assent
Long title
Supreme Court Ordinance 1861	24 Vict. No. 15	17 June 1861
An Ordinance to provide for the more effectual Administration of Justice by establishing a Supreme Court.
	24 Vict. No. 16	17 June 1861
An Ordinance to naturalize Ygnasi Anton Joseph Boladeras.
	25 Vict. No. 1	18 November 1861
An Ordinance for altering Collie Street, in the Town of Fremantle, and for extending the Limits of the 'Fremantle Building Allotment No. 451.'
	25 Vict. No. 2	18 November 1861
An Ordinance for vesting the Ordnance Lands and Buildings in the Principal Secretary of State for the War Department.
Volunteer Force Ordinance 1861	25 Vict. No. 3	18 November 1861
An Ordinance to organize and establish a Volunteer Military Force in Western Australia.
	25 Vict. No. 4	18 November 1861
An Ordinance to repeal the Ordinance intituled "An Ordinance for licensing Hawkers and Pedlers." (Note: 16 Vict. No. 2)
Recognizances (Forfeiture) Ordinance 1861	25 Vict. No. 5	18 November 1861
An Ordinance for the more speedy Levying of forfeited Recognizances.
	25 Vict. No. 6	18 November 1861
An Ordinance to amend "An Ordinance to make compulsory the Practice of Vaccination." (Note: 24 Vict. No. 11)
	25 Vict. No. 7	18 November 1861
An Ordinance for the further Appropriation of the Revenue for the Year 1860, and for the general Appropriation of the Revenue for the Year 1862.
Recovery of Debts Ordinance 1861	25 Vict. No. 8	2 December 1861
An Ordinance to facilitate the Recovery of Debts.
Colonial Passengers Ordinance 1861	25 Vict. No. 9	2 December 1861
An Ordinance to regulate the Carriage of Passengers by Vessels engaged in the coasting Trade.
	25 Vict. No. 10	2 December 1861
An Ordinance to amend an Ordinance intituled "An Ordinance to regulate the Keeping and Carriage of Gunpowder." (Note: 14 Vict. No. 9)
	25 Vict. No. 11	2 December 1861
An Ordinance to amend "The Jury Ordinance 1858." (Note: Jury Ordinance 1858 (22 Vict. No. 7))
	25 Vict. No. 12	2 December 1861
An Ordinance to amend "The Customs Ordinance, 1860." (Note: Customs Ordinance 1860 (24 Vict. No. 5))
Public Pound Ordinance 1861	25 Vict. No. 13	2 December 1861
An Ordinance to regulate the keeping of public Pounds and the Appointment of Poundkeepers.
	25 Vict. No. 14	2 December 1861
An Ordinance to amend the Ordinance 25th Victoria, No. 1 of 1861. (Note: 25 Vict. No. 1)
Police Ordinance 1861	25 Vict. No. 15	11 December 1861
An Ordinance for consolidating and amending the Laws relating to the Police in Western Australia, and for removing and preventing Nuisances and Obstructions therein.

== Sources ==
- "legislation.wa.gov.au".
