= List of acts of the Legislative Council of Western Australia from 1881 =

This is a list of acts of the Legislative Council of Western Australia for the year 1881

== 1881 ==
Short title, or popular name	Citation	Royal assent
Long title
	44 Vict. No. 15	7 April 1881
An Act to make it lawful to close up a certain Street (Note: The part of Terrace Road between East Street to the Helena River.) in the Town of Guildford.
Jury Act (Amendment) 1881	44 Vict. No. 16	7 April 1881
An Act to amend "The Jury Act, 1871," (Note: Jury Act 1871 (35 Vict. No. 8)) and "The Jury Act (Amendment) 1880." (Note: Jury Act (Amendment) 1880 (44 Vict. No. 7))
Railways Amendment Act 1881	44 Vict. No. 17	7 April 1881
An Act to make further provision for the Management and Working of Railways.
Eastern Railway Extension Act 1881	44 Vict. No. 18	7 April 1881
An Act to authorise the Extension of "The Eastern Railway."
Auctioneers' Amendment Act 1881	44 Vict. No. 19	7 April 1881
An Act to amend "The Auctioneers' Act, 1873." (Note: Auctioneers' Act 1873 (37 Vict. No. 3))
Stamp Act 1881	44 Vict. No. 20	7 April 1881
An Act to impose certain Stamp Duties.
Railway Refreshment Room Licensing Act 1881	44 Vict. No. 21	7 April 1881
An Act to enable the Police or Resident Magistrate of a District to issue a Certificate for a License to the Keeper of a Railway Refreshment Room in the District of such Police or Resident Magistrate at any time between any two Quarterly Licensing Meetings.
Loan Act 1881	44 Vict. No. 22	7 April 1881
An Act for raising the sum of One Hundred and Fifty Thousand Pounds by Loan for the construction of certain Public Works and for the repayment to the General Revenue of the Colony of the cost of constructing the Eucla Telegraph Line.
Transfer of Land Act 1874 Amendment Act 1880	44 Vict. No. 23	2 May 1881 (Note: Royal assent delayed as the act was reserved for approval by Her Majesty, rather than by the governor.)
An Act to facilitate Mortgages to Benefit Building Societies under "The Transfer of Land Act, 1874," (Note: Transfer of Land Act 1874 (38 Vict. No. 13)) and to enlarge the provisions of the said Act.
	45 Vict. No. 1	16 September 1881
An Act to regulate the Admission in certain cases of Barristers of the Supreme Court of Western Australia; and to prevent unqualified persons from taking fees in consideration of the performance of Conveyancing, and of work connected with the Administration of the Law relating to Real and Personal Property.
Scab Act Amendment Act 1881	45 Vict. No. 2	16 September 1881
An Act to amend "The Scab Act, 1879." (Note: Scab Act 1879 (43 Vict. No. 16))
	45 Vict. No. 3	16 September 1881
An Act to provide for the destruction of Goats within the precincts of the Municipality of Geraldton.
Oyster Fisheries Act 1881	45 Vict. No. 4	16 September 1881
An Act for the protection of Oysters and encouragement of Oyster Fisheries.
	45 Vict. No. 5	16 September 1881
An Act to provide for the Payment of certain additional and unforeseen Expenses in the year One thousand eight hundred and eighty-one, over and above the Estimates for that year.
	45 Vict. No. 6	16 September 1881
An Act to confirm the Expenditure for the services of the year One thousand eight hundred and seventy-nine, beyond the grant for that year.
Brands Act 1881	45 Vict. No. 7	16 September 1881
An Act to consolidate and amend the Laws regulating the Branding of Live Stock, and to provide for the due Registration of Brands.
Diseases in Vines Act 1881	45 Vict. No. 8	16 September 1881
An Act for the Prevention and Eradication of Diseases in Vines.
	45 Vict. No. 9	16 September 1881
An Act to amend "The Distillation Act, 1871." (Note: Distillation Act 1871 (35 Vict. No. 6))
	45 Vict. No. 10	16 September 1881
An Act to confirm the Expenditure for the services of the year One thousand eight hundred and eighty, beyond the grants for that year.
Law and Parliamentary Library Amendment Act 1881	45 Vict. No. 11	16 September 1881
An Act to amend "The Law and Parliamentary Library Act, 1873." (Note: Law and Parliamentary Library Act 1873 (37 Vict. No. 15))
Municipal Institutions Further Amendment Act 1881	45 Vict. No. 12	16 September 1881
An Act further to amend "The Municipal Institutions Act, 1876." (Note: Municipal Institutions' Act 1876 (40 Vict. No. 13))
	45 Vict. No. 13	16 September 1881
An Act to appropriate the sum of One Hundred and Fifty-eight Thousand Nine Hundred and Eleven Pounds Four Shillings and Sevenpence out of the General Revenue of the Colony for such Services as shall come in course of payment during the year One thousand eight hundred and eighty-two.
	45 Vict. No. 14	16 September 1881
An Act to make it lawful to close up a certain Street (Note: Vine Street between Church Street and the Vasse River.) in the Township of Busselton.
Audit Act 1881	46 Vict. No. 1	24 August 1882
An Act to provide for the more effectual Keeping and Auditing of the Public Accounts.
	46 Vict. No. 2	24 August 1882
An Act for the Re-appropriation of certain Moneys appropriated for the purposes of a Steam Tug, by "The Loan Act, 1878." (Note: Loan Act 1878 (42 Vict. No. 22))
Sandalwood Act 1881	46 Vict. No. 3	24 August 1882
An Act to prevent the Destruction and Export of Immature Sandalwood.

== Sources ==
- "legislation.wa.gov.au".
