= List of acts of the Parliament of Victoria from 1859 =

This is a list of acts of the Parliament of Victoria, Australia for the year 1859.

== 1859 ==
Continuing the third session of the first parliament of Victoria.

Short title, or popular name	Citation	Royal assent
Long title
	22 Vict. No. 66	24 February 1859
An Act to amend an Act intituled "An Act to regulate the Importation Carriage and Custody of Gunpowder 21 Vict. No. 21." (Note: 21 Vict. No. 21) (Repealed by Importation and Custody of Gunpowder Statute 1864 (27 Vict. No. 196))
	22 Vict. No. 67	24 February 1859
An Act for the regulation of the Oyster Fisheries in Victoria. (Repealed by Fisheries and Game Statute 1864 (27 Vict. No. 206))
	22 Vict. No. 68	24 February 1859
An Act for the Continuation of Expiring Laws. (Repealed by Crimes Act 1890 (54 Vict. No. 1079))
	22 Vict. No. 69	24 February 1859
An Act to incorporate a Company to be called "The Bendigo Water Works Company" and for other purposes.
	22 Vict. No. 70	24 February 1859
An Act to amend and consolidate the Laws affecting the Solemnization of Marriage. (Repealed by Marriage and Matrimonial Causes Statute 1864 (28 Vict. No. 268))
Castlemaine Gas Company's Act 1859	22 Vict. No. 71	24 February 1859
An Act to incorporate a Company to be called "The Castlemaine Gas Company," and for other purposes.
	22 Vict. No. 72	24 February 1859
An Act to enable the Trustees for the time being to sell and convey certain Land situate in the City of Melbourne and vested in such Trustees to the use of the Religious Society denominated Wesleyan Methodists.
	22 Vict. No. 73	24 February 1859
An Act to alter and extend some of the provisions contained in "The St. Kilda and Brighton Railway Act 1857" (Note: St. Kilda and Brighton Railway Act 1857 (21 Vict. No. 42)) and for other purposes. (Repealed by 42 Vict. No. 617)
	22 Vict. No. 74	24 February 1859
An Act to incorporate the Shareholders of "The National Bank of Australasia" and for other purposes.
	22 Vict. No. 75	24 February 1859
An Act to reduce the Capital and Borrowing Powers of the Melbourne Exchange Company, and for other purposes.
	22 Vict. No. 76	24 February 1859
An Act to amend the Law relating to the more easy Recovery of certain Debts and Demands. (Repealed by Justices of the Peace Statute 1865 (28 Vict. No. 267))
	22 Vict. No. 77	24 February 1859
An Act for the Protection of the Fisheries of Victoria. (Repealed by 25 Vict. No. 152)
	22 Vict. No. 78	24 February 1859
An Act to amend the Law relating to Innkeepers Carriers and others. (Repealed by Carriers and Innkeepers Act 1890 (54 Vict. No. 1071))
	21 Vict. No. 79	24 February 1859
An Act for an Assessment on Stock. (Repealed by 25 Vict. No. 145)
	22 Vict. No. 80	24 February 1859
An Act to consolidate and amend the Laws affecting the Chinese emigrating to or resident in Victoria. (Repealed by Chinese Immigration Statute 1864 (27 Vict. No. 200))
	22 Vict. No. 81	24 February 1859
An Act to amend the law relating to the Registration of Parliamentary Electors. (Repealed by Electoral Act 1863 (27 Vict. No. 168))
Presbyterian Synod of Victoria Act 1859	22 Vict. No. 82	24 February 1859
An Act to amend an Act intituled "An Act to regulate the temporal affairs of the Synod of Victoria and to amend the law relating thereto." (Note: 17 Vict. No. 19)
	22 Vict. No. 83	24 February 1859
An Act for the establishment of a Board of Agriculture. (Repealed by 34 Vict. No. 380)
	22 Vict. No. 84	24 February 1859
An Act for the Preservation of Fish in the Lakes and Rivers of the Colony of Victoria. (Repealed by 25 Vict. No. 152)
	22 Vict. No. 85	24 February 1859
An Act to authorize the making of the Melbourne and Essendon Railway and for other purposes.
	22 Vict. No. 86	24 February 1859
An Act to amend the Law for the Collection and Payment of the Public Moneys the Audit of the Public Accounts and the Protection and Recovery of the Public Property.
	22 Vict. No. 87	24 February 1859
An Act to declare void a certain Bye-law passed by the Council of the Municipal District of Ballaarat respecting the Supply of Water for Domestic Sanitary and other purposes from Yuille's Swamp.
	22 Vict. No. 88	24 February 1859
An Act to appropriate the Consolidated Revenue to the Service of the year One thousand eight hundred and fifty-nine and for other purposes.
	22 Vict. No. 89	23 April 1859 (Note: This act was reserved for approval by Her Majesty.)
An Act to shorten the duration of the Legislative Assembly. (Repealed by Constitution Act Amendment Act 1890 (54 Vict. No. 1075))
Australian Trust Company Act 1859 (repealed)	22 Vict. No. 90	23 September 1859
An Act to enlarge the powers of the "Australian Trust Company" and to remove doubts as to the validity of Deeds executed by Agents of the Company and for other purposes. (Repealed by Statute Law Repeals Act 2007 (No. 21 of 2007))
	23 Vict. No. 91	12 October 1859
An Act to limit the number of persons holding offices under the Crown who may sit and vote in the Legislative Council and Assembly of Victoria. (Repealed by Constitution Act Amendment Act 1890 (54 Vict. No. 1075))

== Sources ==
- "1859 Victorian Historical Acts". AustLII.
