= List of acts of the Parliament of Western Australia from 2003 =

This is a list of acts of the Parliament of Western Australia for the year 2003.

== 2003 ==
Short title, or popular name	Citation	Royal assent
Long title
Taxation Administration Act 2003	No. 1 of 2003	20 March 2003
An Act to provide for the administration and enforcement of legislation dealing with State taxation.
Public Transport Authority Act 2003	No. 31 of 2003	26 May 2003
An Act to establish a State agency responsible for providing public passenger transport services anywhere in the State and performing functions under other Acts, to amend or repeal certain Acts, and to provide for related matters.
Corruption and Crime Commission Act 2003 or the Corruption, Crime and Misconduct Act 2003	No. 48 of 2003	3 July 2003
An Act to —: provide for the establishment and operation of a Corruption and Crime Commission; provide for the establishment and operation of a Parliamentary Inspector of the Corruption and Crime Commission; repeal the Anti-Corruption Commission Act 1988; (Note: Anti-Corruption Commission Act 1988 (No. 52)); repeal the Criminal Investigation (Exceptional Powers) and Fortification Removal Act 2002; (Note: Criminal Investigation (Exceptional Powers) and Fortification Removal Act 2002 (No. 21)); make amendments and provide for transitional matters as a consequence of the enactment of this Act and the repeal of other Acts.
	No. X of 2003	
Genetically Modified Crops Free Areas Act 2003	No. 79 of 2003	24 December 2003
An Act to prohibit the cultivation of certain genetically modified crops in designated areas of the State and to provide for their destruction in certain cases.

== Sources ==
- "legislation.wa.gov.au".
