= List of acts of the Parliament of Western Australia from 2000 =

This is a list of acts of the Parliament of Western Australia for the year 2000.

== 2000 ==
Short title, or popular name	Citation	Royal assent
Long title
Telecommunications (Interception) Western Australia Amendment Act 2000	No. 1 of 2000	28 March 2000
An Act to amend the Telecommunications (Interception) Western Australia Act 1996 (Note: Telecommunications (Interception) Western Australia Act 1996 (No. 44)) and for related purposes.
State Records Act 2000	No. 52 of 2000	28 November 2000
An Act to provide for the keeping of State records and for related purposes.
	No. X of 2000	
Hope Valley-Wattleup Redevelopment Act 2000	No. 77 of 2000	7 December 2000
An Act to provide for the development and redevelopment of certain land in the local government districts of Cockburn and Kwinana, to confer planning, development control and other functions in respect of that land, and for related purposes.

== Sources ==
- "legislation.wa.gov.au".
