= List of acts of the Parliament of Western Australia from 1965 =

This is a list of acts of the Parliament of Western Australia for the year 1965.

== 1965 ==
Short title, or popular name	Citation	Royal assent
Long title
	No. 1 of 1965	13 August 1965
An Act to apply out of the Consolidated Revenue Fund the sum of Twenty Million Pounds and from Moneys to Credit of the General Loan Fund Six Million Pounds, to the Service of the Year ending 30th June, 1966, and to apply out of the Public Account the Sum of Two Million Pounds for the purpose of temporary Advances to be made by the Treasurer.
Constitution Acts Amendment Act 1965	No. 2 of 1965	13 August 1965
An Act to amend the Constitution Acts Amendment Act, 1899-1963. (Note: Constitution Acts Amendment Act 1899 ())
	No. 46 of 1965	8 November 1965
An Act to apply out of the Consolidated Revenue Fund the sum of Eighteen Million Pounds, and from Moneys to Credit of the General Loan Fund Five Million Pounds to the Service of the Year ending 30th June, 1966.
Constitution Acts Amendment Act (No. 2) 1965	No. 49 of 1965	8 November 1965
An Act to amend the Constitution Acts Amendment Act, 1899-1965.
Statute Law Revision Act 1965	No. 57 of 1965	19 November 1965
An Act to revise the Statute Law by repealing spent unnecessary or superseded enactments.
Statute Law Revision Act (No. 2) 1965	No. 58 of 1965	19 November 1965
An Act to revise the Statute Law by repealing certain spent enactments relating to Commonwealth Powers.
	No. X of 1965	
Appropriation Act 1965-66	No. 111 of 1965	17 December 1965
An Act to appropriate and apply out of the Consolidated Revenue Fund and from Moneys to Credit of the General Loan Fund and from the Public Account certain sums to make good the supplies granted for the service of the Year ending the thirtieth day of June, One thousand nine hundred and sixty-six, and to supplement grants made by the last Parliament during its third Session in adjustment of the Vote "Advance to Treasurer, 1964-65," for charges during the Year ended the 30th day of June, 1965 ; and to approve of certain expenditure under section forty-one of the Forests Act, 1918-1954. (Note: Forests Act, 1918 (No. 8 of 1919))
Loan Act 1965	No. 112 of 1965	17 December 1965
An Act to authorise the raising of a sum of Twenty-seven Million One Hundred and Seventy Thousand Pounds by loan for the construction of certain Public Works and for Other Purposes.
Decimal Currency Act 1965	No. 113 of 1965	21 December 1965
An Act to amend the Law of the State in consequence of the adoption in Australia of Decimal Currency; and for incidental and other purposes.

== Sources ==
- "legislation.wa.gov.au".
