= List of acts of the Parliament of Western Australia from 1988 =

This is a list of acts of the Parliament of Western Australia for the year 1988.

== 1988 ==
Short title, or popular name	Citation	Royal assent
Long title
Treasurer's Advance Authorisation Act 1988	No. 1 of 1988	29 June 1988
An Act to declare the purposes for which the Treasurer's Advance Account may be applied and to specify a limit for the advances that may be authorized from that account in the financial year commencing on 1 July 1988 and to amend section 4 of the Treasurer's Advance Authorization Act 1987. (Note: Treasurer's Advance Authorization Act 1987 (No. 37))
Liquor Licensing Act 1988 or the Liquor Control Act 1988	No. 54 of 1988	9 December 1988
An Act to regulate the sale, supply and consumption of liquor, the use of premises on which liquor is sold, and the services and facilities provided in conjunction with or ancillary to the sale of liquor, to minimise harm or ill-health caused to people, or any group of people due to the use of liquor, to provide for orders that may prohibit persons from being employed at, or from entering, licensed premises, to repeal the Liquor Act 1970, (Note: Liquor Act 1970 (No. 34)) and for related matters.
	No. X of 1988	
Conservation and Land Management Amendment Act 1988	No. 76 of 1988	9 January 1989
An Act to amend the Conservation and Land Management Act 1984. (Note: Conservation and Land Management Act 1984 (No. 126))

== Sources ==
- "legislation.wa.gov.au".
