= List of acts of the Legislative Council of Western Australia from 1887 =

This is a list of acts of the Legislative Council of Western Australia for the year 1887.

== 1887 ==
Short title, or popular name	Citation	Royal assent
Long title
Railway Servants Act 1887	51 Vict. No. 1	22 July 1887
An Act to give the Commissioner of Railways power to appoint and dismiss certain classes of Railway Servants.
	51 Vict. No. 2	
Copyright Register Act 1887	51 Vict. No. 3	
Bunbury Railway Act 1887	51 Vict. No. 4	22 July 1887
An Act to authorise the Construction of the Bunbury Railway.
Prisoners Employment Act 1887	51 Vict. No. 5	
Wreck Act 1887	51 Vict. No. 6	
Documentary Evidence Act 1887	51 Vict. No. 7	
Butterine Act 1887	51 Vict. No. 8	
	51 Vict. No. 9	
Small Debts Act 1887	51 Vict. No. 10	
Clackline–Newcastle Railway Act 1887	51 Vict. No. 11	20 August 1887
An Act to authorise the construction of the Clackline-Newcastle Railway.
Joint Stock Companies' Fees Act 1887	51 Vict. No. 12	
Bills of Sale Act Amendment Act 1887	51 Vict. No. 13	
Fire Inquiry Act 1887	51 Vict. No. 14	
Postage Stamp Ordinance 1854 Amendment Act 1887	51 Vict. No. 15	
Innkeepers Act 1887	51 Vict. No. 16	
Building Act Amendment Act 1887	51 Vict. No. 17	
Pearl Shell Fishery Regulation Acts Amendment Act 1887	51 Vict. No. 18	
	51 Vict. No. 19	
Re-appropriation Act 1887	51 Vict. No. 20	
	51 Vict. No. 21	20 August 1887
An Act to confirm certain Expenditure for the year One thousand eight hundred and eighty-six.

== Sources ==
- "legislation.wa.gov.au".
