= List of acts of the Parliament of Western Australia from 1991 =

This is a list of acts of the Parliament of Western Australia for the year 1991.

== 1991 ==
Short title, or popular name	Citation	Royal assent
Long title
Retail Trading Hours Amendment Act 1991	No. 1 of 1991	17 May 1991
An Act to amend the Retail Trading Hours Act 1987. (Note: Retail Trading Hours Act 1987 (No. 123))
Daylight Saving Act 1991	No. 25 of 1991	11 November 1991
An Act to provide for a trial period of daylight saving throughout the State and a referendum thereafter on the question of daylight saving on a permanent basis, to alter standard time accordingly if the majority of electors indicates approval of daylight saving in the referendum, to repeal the Daylight Saving Act 1983 (Note: Daylight Saving Act 1983 (No. 11)) and for related purposes.
Fitzgerald Street Bus Bridge Act 1991	No. 34 of 1991	3 December 1991
An Act to restrict proposed work on a bus bridge over the railway at Fitzgerald Street, Perth, to allow for community consultation and a proper assessment of alternatives.
	No. X of 1991	
East Perth Redevelopment Act 1991	No. 62 of 1991	30 December 1991
An Act to provide for the redevelopment off certain land in East Perth, and to establish an Authority with planning, development control and other functions in respect of that land.

== Sources ==
- "legislation.wa.gov.au".
