= List of acts of the Parliament of Western Australia from 1985 =

This is a list of acts of the Parliament of Western Australia for the year 1985.

== 1985 ==
Short title, or popular name	Citation	Royal assent
Long title
Acts Amendment (Consumer Affairs) Act 1985	No. 1 of 1985	8 March 1985
An Act to amend the Consumer Affairs Act 1971, (Note: Consumer Affairs Act 1971 (No. 68)) the Building Societies Act 1976, (Note: Building Societies Act 1976 (No. 47)) the Hire-Purchase Act 1959, (Note: Hire-Purchase Act 1959 (No. 58)) the Motor Vehicle Dealers Act 1973, (Note: Motor Vehicle Dealers Act 1973 (No. 101)) the Petroleum Products Pricing Act 1983 (Note: Prevention of Excessive Prices Act 1983 (No. 1)) and the Petroleum Retailers Rights and Liabilities Act 1982. (Note: Petroleum Retailers Rights and Liabilities Act 1982 (No. 105))
Casino (Burswood Island) Agreement Act 1985	No. 9 of 1985	25 March 1985
An Act to ratify and authorize the implementation of an agreement entered into under section 19 of the Casino Control Act 1984 (Note: Casino Control Act 1984 (No. 34)) between the Minister of the Crown to whom the administration of that Act was at the relevant time committed by the Governor and the public companies West Australian Trustees Limited and Burswood Management Limited with respect to the construction and establishment of a casino complex at Burswood Island in the State; to provide for the cancellation or amendment of certain reserves, for the modification of certain planning laws, for certain streets to be surveyed, dedicated and managed and for the Liquor Licensing (Moratorium) Act 1983 (Note: Liquor Licensing (Moratorium) Act 1983 (No. 27)) not to apply to certain applications under the Liquor Act 1970; (Note: Liquor Act 1970 (No. 34)) and to provide for matters incidental to or connected with the foregoing.
Railways Discontinuance Act 1985	No. 18 of 1985	12 April 1985
An Act to Authorize the Discontinuance of certain Railways and for incidental and other purposes.
Bunbury Railway Lands Act 1985	No. 32 of 1985	6 May 1985
An Act revesting certain lands in Her Majesty, enabling the grant of certain lands to The Western Australian Government Railways Commission, closing certain roads and relating to certain reserves and other lands in Bunbury.
Australia Acts (Request) Act 1985	No. 65 of 1985	6 November 1985
An Act to enable the constitutional arrangements affecting the Commonwealth and the States to be brought into conformity with the status of the Commonwealth of Australia as a sovereign, independent and federal nation.
State Planning Commission Act 1985 or the Western Australian Planning Commission Act 1985	No. 91 of 1985	4 December 1985
An Act to establish a body with responsibility for urban, rural and regional land use planning and land development and related matters in the State, and to provide for a planning council for the metropolitan region and a planning council for the remainder of the State, and for connected purposes.
	No. X of 1985	
Travel Agents Act 1985	No. 120 of 1985	30 December 1985
An Act to provide for the licensing of travel agents and generally for the regulation of their operations; and for matters connected therewith or incidental thereto.

== Sources ==
- "legislation.wa.gov.au".
