= List of acts of the Parliament of Australia from 1902 =

This is a list of acts of the Parliament of Australia for the year 1902.

See also the list of acts of the Parliament of Australia.

Not all acts were assigned a short title.

== 1902 ==
Short title, or popular name	Citation	Royal assent
Long title
	No. 1 of 1902	26 February 1902
An Act to grant and apply out of the Consolidated Revenue Fund the sum of Three hundred and twenty thousand nine hundred and fifty-five pounds to the service of the year ending the thirtieth day of June One thousand nine hundred and two.
	No. 2 of 1902	22 March 1902
An Act to grant and apply out of the Consolidated Revenue Fund the sum of Two hundred and sixty-two thousand four hundred and fifteen pounds to the service of the year ending the thirtieth day of June One thousand nine hundred and two.
Coronation Celebration Act 1902 (repealed)	No. 3 of 1902	15 April 1902
An Act to grant and apply out of the Consolidated Revenue Fund the sum of Twenty-three thousand three hundred and fifty pounds for the purpose of defraying expenses attendant upon the celebration of His Majesty’s Coronation.
	No. 4 of 1902	26 April 1902
An Act to grant and apply out of the Consolidated Revenue Fund the sum of Two hundred and eighty-two thousand eight hundred and thirty-four pounds to the service of the year ending the thirtieth day of June One thousand nine hundred and two.
Commonwealth Public Service Act 1902 (repealed)	No. 5 of 1902	5 May 1902
An Act for the regulation of the Public Service.
	No. 6 of 1902	30 May 1902
An Act to grant and apply out of the Consolidated Revenue Fund the sum of Four hundred and ninety-three thousand nine hundred and forty-four pounds to the service of the year ending the thirtieth day of June One thousand nine hundred and two.
Governor-General's Establishment Act 1902 (repealed)	No. 7 of 1902	30 May 1902
An Act relating to the Governor-General's Establishment.
Commonwealth Franchise Act 1902 (repealed)	No. 8 of 1902	12 June 1902
An Act to provide for an Uniform Federal Franchise.
	No. 9 of 1902	19 June 1902
An Act to grant and apply out of Consolidated Revenue Fund the sum of Four hundred and forty-eight thousand eight hundred and eighty-two pounds to the service of the year ending the thirtieth day of June One thousand nine hundred and two.
	No. 10 of 1902	23 June 1902
An Act to grant and apply out of the Consolidated Revenue Fund the sum of Five hundred and eighty-seven thousand two hundred and nineteen pounds to the service of the year ending the thirtieth day of June One thousand nine hundred and three.
Excise Tariff 1902 (repealed)	No. 11 of 1902	26 July 1902
An Act relating to Duties of Excise.
Royal Commissions Act 1902	No. 12 of 1902	8 September 1902
An Act relating to Royal Commissions.
Post and Telegraph Rates Act 1902 (repealed)	No. 13 of 1902	9 September 1902
An Act relating to Postal and Telegraphic Rates.
Customs Tariff 1902 (repealed)	No. 14 of 1902	16 September 1902
An Act relating to Duties of Customs.
	No. 15 of 1902	29 September 1902
An Act to grant and apply out of the Consolidated Revenue Fund the sum of One million three hundred and sixty-five thousand five hundred and ninety-seven pounds to the service of the year ending the thirtieth day of June One thousand nine hundred and three.
Appropriation Act 1901-2 (repealed)	No. 16 of 1902	10 October 1902
An Act to grant and apply out of the Consolidated Revenue Fund the sum of Fifty-two thousand four hundred and ninety-seven pounds to the service of the year ending the thirtieth day of June One thousand nine hundred and two and to appropriate the supplies granted for such year in this session of Parliament.
Appropriation Act 1902-3 (repealed)	No. 17 of 1902	10 October 1902
An Act to grant and apply a sum out of the Consolidated Revenue Fund to the service of the year ending the thirtieth day of June One thousand nine hundred and three and to appropriate the supplies granted for such year in this session of the Parliament.
Appropriation (Works and Buildings) Act 1902-3 (repealed)	No. 18 of 1902	10 October 1902
An Act to grant and apply a sum out of the Consolidated Revenue Fund to the service of the year ending the thirtieth day of June One thousand nine hundred and three for the purposes of Additions, New Works, and Buildings.
Commonwealth Electoral Act 1902 (repealed)	No. 19 of 1902	10 October 1902
An Act to regulate Parliamentary Elections.
Parliamentary Allowances Act 1902 (repealed)	No. 20 of 1902	10 October 1902
An Act relating to the Allowance to Members of each House of the Parliament of the Commonwealth.
Claims against the Commonwealth Act 1902 (repealed)	No. 21 of 1902	10 October 1902
An Act to make temporary provision for enforcing claims against the Commonwealth.

== Sources ==
- "legislation.gov.au".
