= List of acts of the Parliament of Victoria from 1867 =

This is a list of acts of the Parliament of Victoria, Australia for the year 1867.

== 1867 ==
The third session of the fifth parliament of Victoria.

Short title, or popular name	Citation	Royal assent
Long title
	30 Vict. No. 302	12 February 1867
An Act to legalise and make valid certain Insolvencies and proceedings in Insolvency under the "Insolvency Statute 1865." (Note: Insolvency Statute 1865 (28 Vict. No. 273))
	30 Vict. No. 303	12 February 1867
An Act to apply out of the Consolidated Revenue the sum of Ten thousand pounds to the service of the year One thousand eight hundred and sixty-six and Five hundred thousand pounds to the service of the year One thousand eight hundred and sixty-seven.
	30 Vict. No. 304	2 May 1867
An Act to apply out of the Consolidated Revenue the sum of Twenty thousand pounds to the service of the year One thousand eight hundred and sixty-six, and the sum of Five hundred thousand pounds to the service of the year One thousand eight hundred and sixty-seven.
Australian Alliance Assurance Company's Act 1867 (repealed)	31 Vict. No. 305	4 July 1867
An Act to enable the Shareholders of a Joint Stock Insurance Company established in the Colony of Victoria under the name or style of "The Australian Alliance Assurance Company" to sue and be sued in the name of the Chairman for the time being of the Directors of the Company and for other purposes. (Repealed by Statute Law Repeals Act 2012 (No. 30 of 2012))
	31 Vict. No. 306	4 July 1867
An Act for granting to Her Majesty certain Duties of Customs and for altering certain other Duties. (Repealed by Customs Act 1883 (47 Vict. No. 768))
Victorian Mint Act 1867 (repealed)	31 Vict. No. 307	6 September 1867
An Act to make permanent provision for a Branch of the Royal Mint in Victoria. (Repealed by Mint Act 1890 (54 Vict. No. 1167))
	31 Vict. No. 308	6 September 1867
An Act to explain certain Provisions in the Act of Parliament of Victoria No. 295. (Note: 29 Vict. No. 295)
Lunacy Statute 1867 (repealed)	31 Vict. No. 309	6 September 1867
An Act to Consolidate and Amend the Law relating to Lunatics. (Repealed by Lunacy Act 1890 (54 Vict. No. 1113))
	31 Vict. No. 310	6 September 1867
An Act to amend the Laws relating to or affecting Public Health. (Repealed by Cemeteries Act 1890 (54 Vict. No. 1072))
Game Act 1867 (repealed)	31 Vict. No. 311	6 September 1867
An Act to protect Game. (Repealed by Game Act 1890 (54 Vict. No. 1095))
	31 Vict. No. 312	6 September 1867
An Act to amend "The Passengers Harbors and Navigation Statute 1865." (Note: Passengers Harbors and Navigation Statute 1865 (28 Vict. No. 255)) (Repealed by Marine Board Act 1887 (52 Vict. No. 965))
	31 Vict. No. 313	6 September 1867
An Act to amend "The Instruments and Securities Statute 1864." (Note: Instruments and Securities Statute 1864 (27 Vict. No. 204)) (Repealed by Instruments Act 1890 (54 Vict. No. 1103))
	31 Vict. No. 314	6 September 1867
An Act for the continuation of an expiring law.
	31 Vict. No. 315	6 September 1867
An Act to Vest portion of Suburban Section 68 in the Parish of Jika-Jika and County of Bourke in Her Majesty and in the Mayor Councillors and Burgesses of the Borough of East Collingwood.
	31 Vict. No. 316	6 September 1867
An Act to amend "The Mining Statute 1865." (Note: Mining Statute 1865 (29 Vict. No. 291)) (Repealed by Mines Act 1890 (54 Vict. No. 1120))
	31 Vict. No. 317	6 September 1867
An Act to amend the "Transfer of Land Statute." (Note: Transfer of Land Statute 1866 (29 Vict. No. 301)) (Repealed by Transfer of Land Act 1890 (54 Vict. No. 1149))
	31 Vict. No. 318	6 September 1867
An Act to amend the "Real Property Statute 1864." (Note: Real Property Statute 1864 (27 Vict. No. 213)) (Repealed by Real Property Act 1890 (54 Vict. No. 1136))
	31 Vict. No. 319	6 September 1867
An Act to amend "The Justices of the Peace Statute 1865." (Note: Justices of the Peace Statute 1865 (28 Vict. No. 267))
	31 Vict. No. 320	6 September 1867
An Act for the Continuation of an Expiring Law. (Repealed by Imprisonment of Fraudulent Debtors Act 1890 (54 Vict. No. 1100))
Presbyterian Synod of Victoria Act 1867	31 Vict. No. 321	6 September 1867
An Act to amend the Act 22 Victoria No. 82 intituled "An Act to amend an Act intituled 'An Act to regulate the temporal affairs of the Synod of Victoria, and to amend the law relating thereto,' (Note: 17 Vict. No. 19) and for other purposes therein mentioned." (Note: 22 Vict. No. 82)
	31 Vict. No. 322	6 September 1867
An Act to apply the sum of Three hundred thousand Pounds out of the Consolidated Revenue to the service of the Year One thousand eight hundred and sixty-seven.
	31 Vict. No. 323	6 September 1867
An Act to amend the Law relating to Boroughs Shires and Road Districts.
	31 Vict. No. 324	6 September 1867
An Act to amend "The Mining Companies Limited Liability Act 1864." (Note: Mining Companies Limited Liability Act 1864 (27 Vict. No. 228)) (Repealed by Companies Act 1890 (54 Vict. No. 1074))

The fourth session of the fifth parliament of Victoria.

Short title, or popular name	Citation	Royal assent
Long title
	31 Vict. No. 325	
An Act for the continuation of an expiring law. (Repealed by Scab Act 1870 (34 Vict. No. 370))

== Sources ==
- "1867 Victorian Historical Acts". AustLII.
