= List of acts of the Parliament of Victoria from 1908 =

This is a list of acts of the Parliament of Victoria, Australia for the year 1908.

== 1908 ==
Short title, or popular name	Citation	Royal assent
Long title
	8 Edw. VII. No. 2139	10 July 1908
An Act to apply out of the Consolidated Revenue the sum of One million five hundred and thirteen thousand and fifty-seven pounds to the service of the year One thousand nine hundred and eight and One thousand nine hundred and nine.
	8 Edw. VII. No. 2140	30 July 1908
An Act to apply out of the Consolidated Revenue the sum of One hundred and forty-seven thousand three hundred and eighty-two pounds to the service of the year One thousand nine hundred and seven and One thousand nine hundred and eight.
Municipalities American Fleet Celebrations Act 1908	8 Edw. VII. No. 2141	4 August 1908
An Act to authorize and validate certain Expenditure by Councils of Municipalities in connexion with the Visit of the Fleet of the United States of America.
Castlemaine Municipal Site Land Act 1908	8 Edw. VII. No. 2142	4 August 1908
An Act to provide for the Leasing of Certain Land granted as a Site for Municipal Purposes at Castlemaine.
Elsternwick Land Act 1908	8 Edw. VII. No. 2143	18 August 1908
An Act to revoke the Permanent Reservation and Crown Grant of certain Land at Elsternwick in the Municipal District of Brighton.
Ultima and Chillingollah Railway Construction Act 1908	8 Edw. VII. No. 2144	18 August 1908
An Act to authorize the Construction by the State of a Line of Railway from Ultima to Chillingollah.
Mining Development Act 1908 (repealed)	8 Edw. VII. No. 2145	18 August 1908
An Act to further amend the Mining Development Acts. (Repealed by Mining Development Act 1915 (6 Geo. V. No. 2699))
South Melbourne Mechanics' Institute Act 1908	8 Edw. VII. No. 2146	18 August 1908
An Act constituting the Mayor, Councillors, and Citizens of the City of South Melbourne the Trustees of the Mechanics' Institute in the said City.
	8 Edw. VII. No. 2147	8 October 1908
An Act to apply out of the Consolidated Revenue the sum of Eight hundred and fifty-six thousand six hundred and sixty-eight pounds to the service of the year One thousand nine hundred and eight and One thousand nine hundred and nine.
Government Statist Act 1908 (repealed)	8 Edw. VII. No. 2148	20 October 1908
An Act relating to the Appointment of Government Statist. (Repealed by Statistics Act 1915 (6 Geo. V. No. 2730))
Beech Forest and Crowe's Railway Construction Act 1908	8 Edw. VII. No. 2149	20 October 1908
An Act to authorize the Construction by the State of a Line of Railway from Beech Forest to Crowe's.
Gobur Land Act 1908	8 Edw. VII. No. 2150	20 October 1908
An Act to provide for the Revocation of the Permanent Reservation of portion of certain Land reserved as a Site for Race-course and other purposes of Public Recreation at Gobur.
Income Tax Act 1908 (repealed)	8 Edw. VII. No. 2151	20 October 1908
An Act to declare the Kates of Income Tax for the Year ending on the thirty-first day of December One thousand nine hundred and nine. (Repealed by Income Tax Act 1915 (6 Geo. V. No. 2668))
Administration and Probate Duties Act 1908 (repealed)	8 Edw. VII. No. 2152	20 October 1908
An Act relating to Duties payable under the Administration and Probate Acts. (Repealed by Administration and Probate Act 1915 (6 Geo. V. No. 2611))
Stamps Act 1908	8 Edw. VII. No. 2153	20 October 1908
An Act to further amend the Stamps Acts.
Married Women's Property Act 1908 (repealed)	8 Edw. VII. No. 2154	16 November 1908
An Act to further amend the Law relating to Married Women's Property. (Repealed by Married Women's Property Act 1915 (6 Geo. V. No. 2692))
Fences Act 1908 (repealed)	8 Edw. VII. No. 2155	16 November 1908
An Act to amend the Fences Act 1890. (Note: Fences Act 1890 (54 Vict. No. 1092)) (Repealed by Fences Act 1915 (6 Geo. V. No. 2651))
Companies Names Act 1908	8 Edw. VII. No. 2156	16 November 1908
An Act relating to the Name Style or Title of Companies.

== Sources ==
- "1908 Victorian Historical Acts". AustLII.
