= List of acts of the Parliament of Australia from 1907 =

This is a list of acts of the Parliament of Australia for the year 1907.

== 1907 ==
Short title, or popular name	Citation	Royal assent
Long title
Constitution Alteration (Senate Elections) 1906	No. 1 of 1907	3 April 1907
An Act to alter the provisions of the Constitution relating to the Election of Senators.
Supply Act (No. 1) 1907-8 (repealed)	No. 2 of 1907	5 July 1907
An Act to grant and apply out of the Consolidated Revenue Fund a sum for the service of the year ending the thirtieth day of June One thousand nine hundred and eight.
Supply Act (No. 2) 1907-8 (repealed)	No. 3 of 1907	15 August 1907
An Act to grant and apply out of the Consolidated Revenue Fund a sum for the service of the year ending the thirtieth day of June One thousand nine hundred and eight.
Kalgoorlie to Port Augusta Railway Survey Act 1907 (repealed)	No. 4 of 1907	28 August 1907
An Act to authorize the Survey of Route for a Railway to connect Kalgoorlie, in the State of Western Australia, with Port Augusta, in the State of South Australia.
Parliamentary Allowances Act 1907 (repealed)	No. 5 of 1907	28 August 1907
An Act relating to the Allowance to Members of each House of the Parliament of the Commonwealth.
Appropriation (Works and Buildings) Act 1907-8 (repealed)	No. 6 of 1907	8 October 1907
An Act to grant and apply a sum out of the Consolidated Revenue Fund to the service of the year ending the thirtieth day of June One thousand nine hundred and eight for the purposes of Additions, New Works, Buildings, &c.
Commonwealth Salaries Act 1907 (repealed)	No. 7 of 1907	8 October 1907
An Act relating to the Taxation by the States of Salaries and Allowances paid by the Commonwealth.
Judiciary Act 1907 (repealed)	No. 8 of 1907	14 October 1907
An Act to amend the Judiciary Act 1903. (Note: Judiciary Act 1903 (No. 6))
Supply Act (No. 3) 1907-8 (repealed)	No. 9 of 1907	14 November 1907
An Act to grant and apply out of the Consolidated Revenue Fund a sum for the service of the year ending the thirtieth day of June One thousand nine hundred and eight.
Disputed Elections and Qualifications Act 1907 (repealed)	No. 10 of 1907	22 November 1907
An Act to amend the Law relating to Parliamentary Elections and to provide for the Settlement of Questions relating to the Qualifications of Members of the Parliament and to Vacancies in either House of the Parliament.
Supply Act (No. 4) 1907-8 (repealed)	No. 11 of 1907	23 November 1907
An Act to grant and apply out of the Consolidated Revenue Fund a sum for the service of the year ending the thirtieth day of June One thousand nine hundred and eight.
Bounties Act 1907 (repealed)	No. 12 of 1907	28 November 1907
An Act to provide for the Payment of Bounties on the Production of certain Goods.

== Sources ==
- "legislation.gov.au".
