= List of acts of the Parliament of Australia from 1909 =

This is a list of acts of the Parliament of Australia for the year 1909.

== 1909 ==
Short title, or popular name	Citation	Royal assent
Long title
Supply Act (No. 1) 1909-10 (repealed)	No. 1 of 1909	
Old-age Pensions Appropriation Act 1909 (repealed)	No. 2 of 1909	
Invalid and Old-age Pensions Act 1909 (repealed)	No. 3 of 1909	
Audit Act 1909 (repealed)	No. 4 of 1909	
Appropriation (Works and Buildings) Act 1909-10 (repealed)	No. 5 of 1909	
Coinage Act 1909 (repealed)	No. 6 of 1909	
Supply Act (No. 2) 1909-10 (repealed)	No. 7 of 1909	
Supply Act (No. 3) 1909-10 (repealed)	No. 8 of 1909	
Telegraph Act 1909 (repealed)	No. 9 of 1909	
Supply Act (No. 4) 1909-10 (repealed)	No. 10 of 1909	
Marine Insurance Act 1909	No. 11 of 1909	11 November 1909
An Act relating to Marine Insurance.
Appropriation Act 1909-10 (repealed)	No. 12 of 1909	
Supplementary Appropriation Act 1907-8 (repealed)	No. 13 of 1909	
Naval Loan Act 1909 (repealed)	No. 14 of 1909	
Defence Act 1909 (repealed)	No. 15 of 1909	
Supplementary Appropriation (Works and Buildings) Act 1907-8 (repealed)	No. 16 of 1909	
Patents Act 1909 (repealed)	No. 17 of 1909	
Surplus Revenue Act 1909 (repealed)	No. 18 of 1909	
Commonwealth Electoral Act 1909 (repealed)	No. 19 of 1909	
Referendum (Constitution Alteration) Act 1909 (repealed)	No. 20 of 1909	
Invalid and Old-age Pensions Act 1909 No. 2 (repealed)	No. 21 of 1909	
High Commissioner Act 1909 (repealed)	No. 22 of 1909	13 December 1909
An Act to provide for the Office of High Commissioner of the Commonwealth in the United Kingdom. (Repealed by High Commissioner (United Kingdom) Act Repeal Act 1973 (No. 156)
Seat of Government Acceptance Act 1909	No. 23 of 1909	13 December 1909
An Act relating to the Acceptance of the Territory surrendered by the State of New South Wales for the Seat of Government of the Commonwealth.
Officers' Compensation Act 1909 (repealed)	No. 24 of 1909	13 December 1909
Commonwealth Public Service Act 1909 (repealed)	No. 25 of 1909	13 December 1909
Australian Industries Preservation Act 1909 (repealed)	No. 26 of 1909	13 December 1909
Bills of Exchange Act 1909	No. 27 of 1909	13 December 1909
An Act relating to Bills of Exchange, Cheques and Promissory Notes.
Commonwealth Conciliation and Arbitration Act 1909 (repealed)	No. 28 of 1909	13 December 1909
Seamen's Compensation Act 1909 (repealed)	No. 29 of 1909	13 December 1909
An Act relating to compensation to Seamen for injuries suffered in the course of their employment.

== Sources ==
- "legislation.gov.au".
