= List of ordinances of the Legislative Council of Western Australia from 1846 =

This is a list of ordinances of the Legislative Council of Western Australia for the year 1846.

== 1846 ==
Short title, or popular name	Citation	Royal assent
Long title
	9 Vict. No. 7	16 April 1846
An Ordinance to repeal certain Acts imposing Duties on Goods imported into Western Australia, and to impose other Duties in lieu thereof. (Repealed by 12 Vict. No. 8)
	9 Vict. No. 8	23 April 1846
An Ordinance to continue for a limited time the Ordinance to regulate the temporary occupation of Crown Lands in the colony of Western Australia.
	9 Vict. No. 9	23 April 1846
An Ordinance for the remission of Duties on Wines, for the consumption of Regimental Officers, serving in Western Australia.
	9 Vict. No. 10	23 April 1846
An Ordinance to amend an Act intituled "An Act for the regulation of Pilotage and Shipping in the Harbours of Western Australia." (Note: 4 & 5 Vict. No. 15) (Repealed by Shipping and Pilotage Consolidation Ordinance 1855 (18 Vict. No. 15))
	9 Vict. No. 11	7 May 1846
An Ordinance for applying certain Sums arising from the Revenue receivable in the Colony of Western Australia to the service thereof, for the Financial Year commencing First of April, One thousand eight hundred and forty-seven; and for the further appropriating the said Revenue. (Repealed by Statute Law Revision Act 1964 (13 Eliz. II. No. 61))

== Sources ==
- "legislation.wa.gov.au".
