= List of acts of the Parliament of Western Australia from 1938 =

This is a list of acts of the Parliament of Western Australia for the year 1938.

== 1938 ==
Short title, or popular name	Citation	Royal assent
Long title
	No. 1 of 1938	29 August 1938
An Act to apply out of the Consolidated Revenue Fund the sum of One Million Seven Hundred Thousand Pounds, and from Moneys to Credit of the General Loan Fund Five Hundred Thousand Pounds, to the Service of the Year ending 30th June, 1939, and to apply out of the Public Account the sum of Three Hundred Thousand Pounds for the purpose of temporary Advances to be made by the Treasurer.
Mullewa Road Board Loan Rate Act 1938	No. 2 of 1938	25 October 1938
An Act to authorise the Mullewa Road Board to levy a certain loan rate upon rateable land within a portion only of the Mullewa Road District and to validate such loan rate as already levied in respect of rateable land within such portion of the said district.
State Government Insurance Office Act 1938	No. 39 of 1938	31 January 1939
An Act to authorise the establishment of the State Government Insurance Office; to authorise the carrying on of certain insurance business by the said State Government Insurance Office; to validate all the transactions in the nature of insurance business hitherto carried on through the said State Government Insurance Office, and for other relative purposes.
State Transport Co-ordination Act Amendment Act 1938	No. 47 of 1938	31 January 1939
An Act to amend the State Transport Co-ordination Act, 1933. (Note: State Transport Co-ordination Act 1933 (No. 42))
	No. X of 1938	
Marketing of Onions Act 1938	No. 52 of 1938	31 January 1939
An Act to make provision for the marketing, sale and disposal of onions, and to constitute an Onion Marketing Board, and for other relative purposes.

== Sources ==
- "legislation.wa.gov.au".
