= List of ordinances of the Legislative Council of Western Australia from 1850 =

This is a list of ordinances of the Legislative Council of Western Australia for the year 1850.

== 1850 ==
Short title, or popular name	Citation	Royal assent
Long title
	13 Vict. No. 2	18 February 1850
An Ordinance for the appropriation of the Revenue for the Year One Thousand Eight Hundred and Fifty One, and to provide for the payment of certain unforeseen expenses during the Year One Thousand Eight Hundred and Fifty. (Repealed by Statute Law Revision Act 1964 (13 Eliz. II. No. 61))
	14 Vict. No. 1	27 November 1850
An Ordinance to protect Justices of the Peace from vexatious Actions for acts done by them in execution of their Office.
	14 Vict. No. 2	2 December 1850
An Ordinance to provide for the establishment of a scale of Pilotage Fees and Light Dues. (Repealed by Shipping and Pilotage Consolidation Ordinance 1855 (18 Vict. No. 15))
Imperial Act Adopting Ordinance 1850	14 Vict. No. 3	27 November 1850
An Ordinance for the adoption of an Act of the Imperial Parliament for the removal of defects in the administration of Criminal Justice. (Note: Criminal Procedure Act 1848 (11 & 12 Vict. c. 46 (Imp)))
	14 Vict. No. 4	28 November 1850
An Ordinance to facilitate the performance of Duties of Justices of the Peace out of Quarter Sessions in Western Australia with respect to persons charged with Indictable Offences.
	14 Vict. No. 5	2 December 1850
An Ordinance to facilitate the performance of the Duties of Justices of the Peace out of Sessions within the Colony of Western Australia with respect to Summary Convictions and Orders.
	14 Vict. No. 6	2 December 1850
An Ordinance to provide for the due Custody and Discipline of Offenders Transported to Western Australia; and of Offenders sentenced therein to Transportation.
	14 Vict. No. 7	2 December 1850
An Ordinance to regulate the Collection of Tolls.
	14 Vict. No. 8	2 December 1850
An Ordinance to regulate the Grazing of Cattle and certain other Stock kept in Towns.
	14 Vict. No. 9	2 December 1850
An Ordinance to regulate the keeping and carriage of Gunpowder.
	14 Vict. No. 10	2 December 1850
An Ordinance to naturalize Thomas Frederick Gilman.
	14 Vict. No. 11	2 December 1850
An Ordinance to extend the Law of Quarantine.
	14 Vict. No. 12	2 December 1850
An Ordinance for the Disposal of Balances of Estates of Deceased Persons remaining unclaimed in the hands of the Public Administrator.
	14 Vict. No. 13	2 December 1850
An Ordinance to facilitate the apprehension in Western Australia of offenders who may have escaped thereto from any of the neighbouring Colonies of Australasia.
	14 Vict. No. 14	4 December 1850
An Ordinance for Licensing Carts and Carriers.
	14 Vict. No. 15	4 December 1850
An Ordinance to provide for the Improvement of Towns in Western Australia. (Repealed by Municipal Institutions' Act 1871 (34 Vict. No. 6))
	14 Vict. No. 16	6 December 1850
An Ordinance to provide for the payment of certain unforeseen Expenses during the year one thousand eight hundred and fifty. (Repealed by Statute Law Revision Act 1964 (13 Eliz. II. No. 61))

== Sources ==
- "legislation.wa.gov.au".
