= List of acts of the Parliament of Victoria from 1888 =

This is a list of acts of the Parliament of Victoria, Australia for the year 1888.

== 1888 ==
Short title, or popular name	Citation	Royal assent
Long title
	52 Vict. No. 964	27 July 1888
An Act to apply out of the Consolidated Revenue the sum of Two million four hundred and ninety-four thousand five hundred and fifty pounds to the service of the year One thousand eight hundred and eighty eight and nine.
Marine Board Act 1887 (Note: Although passed in the year 1887, and given a short title ending '...Act 1887', the need to obtain approval for this act from the United Kingdom meant it was not proclaimed until the year 1888.) (repealed)	52 Vict. No. 965	10 September 1888 (Note: This act was reserved for approval by Her Majesty.)
An Act to Establish a Marine Board and for other purposes. (Repealed by Marine Act 1890 (54 Vict. No. 1165))
Municipal Overdrafts (Indemnity) Act 1888 (repealed)	52 Vict. No. 966	4 October 1888
An Act to indemnify the Councillors of various Municipalities for Borrowing Moneys by Overdrafts on Bankers for the purposes of their Municipalities contrary to the provisions of the "Local Government Act 1874" (Note: Local Government Act 1874 (38 Vict. No. 506)) and for other purposes. (Repealed by Local Government Act 1890 (54 Vict. No. 1112))
	52 Vict. No. 967	16 October 1888
An Act to apply out of the Consolidated Revenue the sum of Nine hundred and forty-four thousand eight hundred and twenty pounds to the service of the year One thousand eight hundred and eighty eight and nine.
Marine Board (Amending) Act 1888 (repealed)	52 Vict. No. 968	29 October 1888
An Act to repeal certain portions of "The Marine Board Act 1887," (Note: Marine Board Act 1887 (52 Vict. No. 965)) and for other purposes. (Repealed by Marine Act 1890 (54 Vict. No. 1165))
	52 Vict. No. 969	26 November 1888
An Act to extend the franchise to Members of the Police Force. (Repealed by Police Regulation Act 1890 (54 Vict. No. 1127))
	52 Vict. No. 970	3 December 1888
An Act to enable the Mayor Councillors and Citizens of the City of Richmond to demise for terms of years certain lands vested in them and for other purposes.
	52 Vict. No. 971	3 December 1888
An Act to amend an Act intituled "An Act to establish and regulate a Permanent Fund in connection with the Australasian Dramatic and Musical Association." (Note: 40 Vict. No. 542)
	42 Vict. No. 972	3 December 1888
An Act to amend "The Instruments and Securities Statute 1864." (Note: Instruments and Securities Statute 1864 (27 Vict. No. 204)) (Repealed by Instruments Act 1890 (54 Vict. No. 1103))
	52 Vict. No. 973	3 December 1888
An Act to enable the Mayor Councillors and Burgesses of the Town of North Melbourne to demise for terms of years certain lands situate in the said Town and permanently reserved for municipal purposes by the Act DCCCCVI. (Note: 50 Vict. No. 906) and for other purposes.
	52 Vict. No. 974	3 December 1888
An Act to amend "The Zoological and Acclimatisation Society Incorporation Act 1884" (Note: Zoological and Acclimatisation Society Incorporation Act 1884 (48 Vict. No. 794)) and for other purposes.
Ballarat Trustees Executors and Agency Company Limited Act 1888	52 Vict. No. 975	3 December 1888
An Act to confer powers upon The Ballarat Trustees Executors and Agency Company Limited.
Gaols Act 1888 (repealed)	52 Vict. No. 976	3 December 1888
An Act to further amend "The Statute of Gaols 1864." (Note: Statute of Gaols 1864 (27 Vict. No. 219)) (Repealed by Gaols Act 1890 (54 Vict. No. 1096))
	52 Vict. No. 977	3 December 1888
An Act to apply out of "The Railway Loan Account 1885" or temporarily out of "The Public Account" certain sums of money for Railway Works and other purposes.
Equity Trustees Executors and Agency Company Limited Act 1888	52 Vict. No. 978	10 December 1888
An Act to confer powers upon the Equity Trustees Executors and Agency Company Limited.
Sandhurst and Northern District Trustees Executors and Agency Company Limited Act 1888	52 Vict. No. 979	10 December 1888
An Act to confer powers upon the Sandhurst and Northern District Trustees Executors and Agency Company Limited.
Cape Patterson and Kilcunda Junction Railway Act 1888	52 Vict. No. 980	1 December 1888
An Act to authorize the construction of the Cape Patterson and Kilcunda Junction Railway and for other purposes.
	52 Vict. No. 981	10 December 1888
An Act to confer powers upon the Australasian Natives Trustees Executors and Agency Company Limited.
	52 Vict. No. 982	10 December 1888
An Act to confer powers upon the Guardian Trustees and Executors Company Limited.
	52 Vict. No. 983	14 December 1888
An Act to enable certain Lessees to Vote at the Election of Commissioners of Irrigation and Water Supply Trusts under "The Irrigation Act 1886" (Note: Irrigation Act 1886 (50 Vict. No. 898)) and for other purposes. (Repealed by Water Act 1890 (54 Vict. No. 1156))
	52 Vict. No. 984	14 December 1888
An Act to restrain persons employed in the Public Service from accepting or holding any office or employment other than in connection with the duties of their offices in the Public Service. (Repealed by Public Service Act 1890 (54 Vict. No. 1133))
Expiring Laws Continuance Act 1888	52 Vict. No. 985	17 December 1888
An Act to continue various Expiring Laws.
Lunacy Amendment Act 1888 (repealed)	52 Vict. No. 986	17 December 1888
An Act to further amend the "Lunacy Statute." (Note: Lunacy Statute 1867 (31 Vict. No. 309)) (Repealed by Lunacy Act 1890 (54 Vict. No. 1113))
Water Supply Loans Act 1888	52 Vict. No. 987	17 December 1888
An Act to sanction the issue and application of certain sums of money as Loans for Irrigation Works and Water Supply in the Country Districts and for other purposes.
	52 Vict. No. 988	17 December 1888
An Act to revest certain lands at Gembrook in Her Majesty the Queen and for other purposes.
Railway Loan Act 1888	52 Vict. No. 989	17 December 1888
An Act to authorize the Raising of Money for Railways and Irrigation Works and for other purposes.
Trustees Companies' Act 1888	52 Vict. No. 990	20 December 1888
An Act for the regulation of Companies authorized to act as Executors Administrators and Trustees and in other fiduciary capacities.
Banking Companies' Registration Act 1888 (repealed)	52 Vict. No. 991	20 December 1888
An Act to further amend "The Companies Statute 1864." (Note: Companies Statute 1864 (27 Vict. No. 190)) (Repealed by Companies Act 1890 (54 Vict. No. 1074))
Officers of Parliament Act 1888 (repealed)	52 Vict. No. 992	20 December 1888
An Act to make better provision for the Appointment Promotion and Control of Officers and others in the service of the Parliament of Victoria. (Repealed by Constitution Act Amendment Act 1890 (54 Vict. No. 1075))
Residence Areas Act 1888 (repealed)	52 Vict. No. 993	20 December 1888
An Act to further amend "The Residence Areas Act 1881." (Note: Residence Areas Act 1881 (45 Vict. No. 709)) (Repealed by Mines Act 1890 (54 Vict. No. 1120))
	52 Vict. No. 994	20 December 1888
An Act to amend the Acts relating to the Melbourne Harbor Trust. (Repealed by Melbourne Harbor Trust Act 1890 (54 Vict. No. 1119))
Legislative Council Amending Act 1888 (repealed)	52 Vict. No. 995	22 December 1888
An Act to amend the Acts relating to the Election of Members to serve in and the Constitution of the Legislative Council. (Repealed by Constitution Act Amendment Act 1890 (54 Vict. No. 1075))
Sales by Auction Amending Act 1888 (repealed)	52 Vict. No. 996	22 December 1888
An Act to amend "The Sales by Auction Statute 1864." (Note: Sales by Auction Statute 1864 (27 Vict. No. 203)) (Repealed by Auction Sales Act 1890 (54 Vict. No. 1065))
Marine Stores and Old Metals Act 1888 (repealed)	52 Vict. No. 997	22 December 1888
An Act to regulate the business and to provide for the licensing of Collectors of Special Wares Marine Stores and Old Metals, and to provide for the licensing of Dealers in Special Wares Marine Stores and Old Metals, and for amending "The Old Metal Dealers Act 1876." (Note: Old Metal Dealers Act 1876 (40 Vict. No. 546)) (Repealed by Marine Stores and Old Metals Act 1890 (54 Vict. No. 1114))
Mining on Private Property Amendment Act 1888 (repealed)	52 Vict. No. 998	22 December 1888
An Act to amend "The Mining on Private Property Act 1884." (Note: Mining on Private Property Act 1884 (48 Vict. No. 796)) (Repealed by Mines Act 1890 (54 Vict. No. 1120))
Act for the Amalgamation of certain Trustee Companies 1888	52 Vict. No. 999	22 December 1888
An Act to facilitate the Amalgamation of the Union Trustees Executors and Administrators Company Limited, the Colonial Permanent Trustee Executor and Agency Company Limited, the Australasian Natives Trustees Executors and Agency Company Limited, and the Guardian Trustees and Executors Company Limited.
Discipline Act 1888 (repealed)	52 Vict. No. 1000	22 December 1888
An Act to amend "The Discipline Act 1870" (Note: Discipline Act 1870 (34 Vict. No. 389)) and the Acts amending the same, and for other purposes. (Repealed by Defences and Discipline Act 1890 (54 Vict. No. 1083))
Education (Teachers) Act 1888 (repealed)	52 Vict. No. 1001	22 December 1888
An Act to make better provision for the Employment Transfer and Promotion of Teachers in the Education Department and for other purposes. (Repealed by Public Service Act 1890 (54 Vict. No. 1133))
Banks and Currency Amendment Statute 1887 (repealed)	52 Vict. No. 1002	22 December 1888
An Act to amend "The Banks and Currency Statute 1864." (Note: Banks and Currency Statute 1864 (27 Vict. No. 194)) (Repealed by Banks and Currency Act 1890 (54 Vict. No. 1164))
Railway Melbourne Lands Exchange Act 1888	52 Vict. No. 1003	22 December 1888
An Act to make provision for the Vesting of certain Lands in the Board of Land and Works, the Victorian Railways Commissioners, the Mayor Aldermen Councillors and Citizens of the City of Melbourne respectively.
Electoral (Amending) Act 1888 (repealed)	52 Vict. No. 1004	22 December 1888
An Act to amend "The Electoral Act 1865" (Note: Electoral Act 1865 (29 Vict. No. 279)) and for other purposes. (Repealed by Constitution Act Amendment Act 1890 (54 Vict. No. 1075))
Chinese Immigration Restriction Act 1888 (repealed)	52 Vict. No. 1005	22 December 1888
An Act for the further Restriction of Chinese Immigration. (Repealed by Chinese Act 1890 (54 Vict. No. 1073))
	52 Vict. No. 1006	22 December 1888
An Act to apply a sum out of the Consolidated Revenue to the service of the year ending on the thirtieth day of June One thousand eight hundred and eighty-nine and to appropriate the Supplies granted in this Session of Parliament.
Licensing Amendment Act 1888 (repealed)	52 Vict. No. 1007	22 December 1888
An Act to further amend "The Licensing Act 1885." (Note: Licensing Act 1885 (49 Vict. No. 857)) (Repealed by Licensing Act 1890 (54 Vict. No. 1111))
Electoral Act Amendment Act 1888 (repealed)	52 Vict. No. 1008	22 December 1888
An Act to provide for the alteration of the Boundaries of certain Electoral Districts and for other purposes. (Repealed by Constitution Act Amendment Act 1890 (54 Vict. No. 1075))
Inebriate Asylums Act 1888 (repealed)	52 Vict. No. 1009	22 December 1888
An Aet to provide for the establishment of Asylums for Inebriates. (Repealed by Inebriates Act 1890 (54 Vict. No. 1101))
Stamp Duties Amendment Act 1888 (repealed)	52 Vict. No. 1010	22 December 1888
An Act to amend the law relating to the Collection of Revenue and the Issue of Insurance Licences by the Registrar-General and the law relating to the Collection of Revenue by Stamps. (Repealed by Stamps Act 1890 (54 Vict. No. 1140))
Public Health Act 1888 (repealed)	52 Vict. No. 1011	22 December 1888
An Act to further amend the Law relating to Public Health and for other purposes. (Repealed by Health Act 1890 (54 Vict. No. 1098))

== Sources ==
- "1888 Victorian Historical Acts". AustLII.
