= List of acts of the Parliament of Victoria from 1862 =

This is a list of acts of the Parliament of Victoria, Australia for the year 1862.

== 1862 ==
The first session of the third parliament of Victoria.

Short title, or popular name	Citation	Royal assent
Long title
	25 Vict. No. 131	21 January 1862
An Act to remove Doubts as to the construction of certain Statutes and as to the validity of certain Acts purporting to be performed under them and for other purposes. (Repealed by Constitution Act Amendment Act 1890 (54 Vict. No. 1075))
	25 Vict. No. 132	19 March 1862
An Act to amend an Act intituled "An Act to consolidate and amend the Laws affecting the Chinese emigrating to or resident in Victoria." (Note: 22 Vict. No. 80) (Repealed by Chinese Immigration Statute 1864 (27 Vict. No. 200))
	25 Vict. No. 133	19 March 1862
An Act to amend an Act intituled "An Act to regulate the Conveyance of Passengers to Victoria." (Note: 18 Vict. No. 5) (Repealed by Passengers Harbors and Navigation Statute 1865 (28 Vict. No. 255))
	25 Vict. No. 134	
An Act to enable the Melbourne and Suburban Railway Company to sell their Undertaking and Property and for other purposes. (Repealed by 42 Vict. No. 617)
	25 Vict. No. 135	14 May 1862
An Act to amend an Act intituled "An Act for granting Duties of Customs upon Gold exported from Victoria." (Note: 18 Vict. No. 27) (Repealed by 29 Vict. No. 293)
	25 Vict. No. 136	14 May 1862
An Act to amend an Act intituled "An Act to prevent the further spread of the disease in Cattle called Pleuro-pneumonia." (Note: 25 Vict. No. 123) (Repealed by Prevention of Diseases of Animals Statute 1864 (27 Vict. No. 231))
	25 Vict. No. 137	14 May 1862
An Act to suspend the operation of certain Enactments relating to Registration of Parliamentary Electors and for other purposes. (Repealed by Electoral Act 1863 (27 Vict. No. 168))
	25 Vict. No. 138	18 June 1862
An Act to apply the sum of Four hundred and twenty-two thousand two hundred and fifty pounds (Note: £422,000 in 1862 is equivalent to A$60,500,000 in 2022.) out of the Consolidated Revenue to the service of the year One thousand eight hundred and sixty-two.
	25 Vict. No. 139	18 June 1862
An Act to apply a sum out of the Consolidated Revenue to the Service of the year One thousand eight hundred and sixty-two and to appropriate the Supplies granted in this Session of Parliament and for other purposes.
Real Property Act 1862 (repealed)	25 Vict. No. 140	18 June 1862
An Act to simplify the Laws relating to the Transfer and Encumbrance of Freehold and other Interests in Land. (Repealed by Transfer of Land Statute 1866 (29 Vict. No. 301))
	25 Vict. No. 141	18 June 1862
An Act to prevent Frauds upon Creditors by secret Bills of Sale of Personal Chattels. (Repealed by Instruments and Securities Statute 1864 (27 Vict. No. 204))
	25 Vict. No. 142	18 June 1862
An Act to authorize the Exportation from the Colony of Victoria free of Customs duty of Gold not being the produce of the said Colony and for other purposes. (Repealed by Customs Act 1883 (47 Vict. No. 768))
	25 Vict. No. 143	18 June 1862
An Act to repeal the Act intituled "An Act for preventing the extension of the Disease called Scab in Sheep" (Note: 18 Vict. No. 38) and to substitute other provisions in lieu thereof. (Repealed by Prevention of Diseases of Animals Statute 1864 (27 Vict. No. 231))
	25 Vict. No. 144	
An Act to amend the laws relating to the Customs. (Repealed by 29 Vict. No. 293)
Land Act 1862 or the Crown Lands Act 1862 (repealed)	25 Vict. No. 145	18 June 1862
An Act to consolidate and amend the Laws relating to the Sale and Occupation of Crown Lands. (Repealed by Land Act 1869 (33 Vict. No. 360))
	25 Vict. No. 146	18 June 1862
An Act for the Punishment of any Person who shall by his negligence cause grievous bodily Injury to any other Person. (Repealed by Criminal Law and Practice Statute 1864 (27 Vict. No. 233))
Distillation Act 1862 (repealed)	25 Vict. No. 147	18 June 1862
An Act to consolidate and amend the Law relating to the distillation rectifying and compounding of Spirits to the granting a duty upon Spirits distilled in Victoria and to regulate the brewing of Beer and the sale of fermented and spirituous Liquors in certain cases. (Repealed by Customs and Excise Duties Act 1890 (54 Vict. No. 1082))
	25 Vict. No. 148	18 June 1862
An Act to amend the Law relating to Leases of Auriferous Lands and for other purposes. (Repealed by Mining Statute 1865 (29 Vict. No. 291))
	25 Vict. No. 149	18 June 1862
An Act for the better Maintenance and Establishment of Common Schools in Victoria. (Repealed by Education Act 1872 (36 Vict. No. 447))
Melbourne and Geelong Railway Act 1862 (repealed)	25 Vict. No. 150	18 June 1862
An Act to Authorize the Borrowing of Three Hundred Thousand Pounds (Note: £300,000 in 1862 is equivalent to A$43,000,000 in 2022.) for the purpose of Repairing a certain portion of the Railway from Melbourne to Geelong and of Forming a Junction Line between the Railway from Melbourne to Geelong and the Railway from Geelong to Ballaarat and for the Formation of such Junction Line and also the Deviation Line and for other purposes in connection with the said Railway from Melbourne to Geelong. (Repealed by Public Works Statute 1865 (29 Vict. No. 289))
	25 Vict. No. 151	18 June 1862
An Act for Weights and Measures. (Repealed by Weights and Measures Statute 1864 (27 Vict. No. 215))
	25 Vict. No. 152	18 June 1862
An Act to amend and consolidate the Laws for the Protection of the Fisheries of Victoria. (Repealed by Fisheries and Game Statute 1864 (27 Vict. No. 206))
	25 Vict. No. 153	18 June 1862
An Act to amend the Law relating to the Drainage of Quartz Reefs. (Repealed by Mining Statute 1865 (29 Vict. No. 291))
	25 Vict. No. 154	18 June 1862
An Act to amend in certain respects the Law relating to Licensed Public Houses. (Repealed by Wines Beer and Spirit Sale Statute 1864 (27 Vict. No. 227))
	25 Vict. No. 155	18 June 1862
An Act to amend an Act (Note: 21 Vict. No. 7) for granting a Duty of Customs on Opium. (Repealed by 29 Vict. No. 293)
	25 Vict. No. 156	18 June 1862
An Act for regulating Schools of Anatomy. (Repealed by Medical Practitioners Statute 1865 (28 Vict. No. 262))
United Church of England and Ireland Act 1862	25 Vict. No. 157	18 June 1862
An Act to repeal "An Act to regulate the temporal affairs of Churches and Chapels of the United Church of England and Ireland in New South Wales" (Note: English Church Temporalities Act 1837 (8 Will. IV No. 5 (NSW))) and to make other provisions instead thereof.
Medical Practitioners Act 1862 (repealed)	25 Vict. No. 158	18 June 1862
An Act to amend the Laws relating to the Registration of Legally Qualified Medical Practitioners. (Repealed by Medical Practitioners Statute 1865 (28 Vict. No. 262))
	25 Vict. No. 159	18 June 1862
An Act for the better administration of the Law by Justices of the Peace and for other purposes in connection therewith. (Repealed by Justices of the Peace Statute 1865 (28 Vict. No. 267))
Civil Service Act 1862 or the Public Service Act 1862 (repealed)	25 Vict. No. 160	18 June 1862
An Act to regulate the Civil Service. (Repealed by Public Service Act 1883 (47 Vict. No. 773))
	25 Vict. No. 161	18 June 1862
An Act to provide for the Preservation of Imported Game and during the Breeding Season of Native Game. (Repealed by Fisheries and Game Statute 1864 (27 Vict. No. 206))

The second session of the third parliament of Victoria.

Short title, or popular name	Citation	Royal assent
Long title
	26 Vict. No. 162	19 December 1862
An Act to apply out of the Consolidated Revenue the sum of Thirty-six thousand pounds (Note: £36,000 in 1862 is equivalent to A$5,200,000 in 2022.) to the service of the year One thousand eight hundred and sixty-two and the sum of Five hundred thousand pounds (Note: £500,000 in 1862 is equivalent to A$71,700,000 in 2022.) to the service of the year One thousand eight hundred and sixty-three.

== Sources ==
- "1862 Victorian Historical Acts". AustLII.
