= List of acts of the Parliament of Western Australia from 2001 =

This is a list of acts of the Parliament of Western Australia for the year 2001.

== 2001 ==
Short title, or popular name	Citation	Royal assent
Long title
Treasurer's Advance Authorisation Act 2001	No. 1 of 2001	1 June 2001
An Act to authorise the Treasurer to make certain payments and advances and to specify a limit for the payments and advances so authorised for the financial year commencing on 1 July 2001 and to amend the Treasurer's Advance Authorisation Act 2000. (Note: Treasurer's Advance Authorisation Act 2000 (No. 30))
Mutual Recognition (Western Australia) Act 2001	No. 6 of 2001	29 June 2001
An Act to continue the adoption of the Mutual Recognition Act 1992 (Note: Mutual Recognition Act 1992 (No. 198 (Cth))) of the Parliament of the Commonwealth (and any amendments made to it before the enactment of this Act) which provides for the recognition within each State and Territory of the Commonwealth of regulatory standards adopted elsewhere in Australia regarding goods and occupations, and for related purposes.
Corporations (Commonwealth Powers) Act 2001	No. 7 of 2001	28 June 2001
An Act to refer certain matters relating to corporations and financial products and services to the Parliament of the Commonwealth for the purposes of section 51(xxxvii) of the Constitution of the Commonwealth, and for related purposes.
Corporations (Ancillary Provisions) Act 2001	No. 8 of 2001	28 June 2001
An Act to enact ancillary provisions, including transitional provisions, relating to the enactment by the Parliament of the Commonwealth of new corporations legislation and new ASIC legislation under its legislative powers, including powers with respect to matters referred to that Parliament for the purposes of section 51(xxxvii) of the Constitution of the Commonwealth, and to amend certain Acts, and for other purposes.
Corporations (Administrative Actions) Act 2001	No. 9 of 2001	28 June 2001
An Act relating to administrative actions taken by Commonwealth authorities or officers of the Commonwealth under certain State laws relating to corporations.
Corporations (Consequential Amendments) Act 2001	No. 10 of 2001	28 June 2001
An Act to amend various Acts as a consequence of the Commonwealth enacting the Corporations Act 2001, (Note: Corporations Act 2001 (No. 50 (Cth))) and for related purposes.
Railway (Narngulu to Geraldton) Act 2001	No. 17 of 2001	29 August 2001
An Act to authorise the construction of a railway from the railway yard at Narngulu to the Port of Geraldton.
Zoological Parks Authority Act 2001	No. 24 of 2001	26 November 2001
An Act to—: establish an Authority to control and manage zoological parks; repeal the Zoological Gardens Act 1972; (Note: Zoological Gardens Act 1972 (No. 12)); consequentially amend certain other Acts, and for related purposes.
	No. X of 2001	
Appropriation (Consolidated Fund) Act (No. 2) 2001	No. 41 of 2001	7 January 2002
An Act to grant supply and to appropriate and apply out of the Consolidated Fund certain sums for the capital purposes of the year ending 30 June 2002.

== Sources ==
- "legislation.wa.gov.au".
