= List of acts of the Parliament of Western Australia from 1993 =

This is a list of acts of the Parliament of Western Australia for the year 1993.

== 1993 ==
Short title, or popular name	Citation	Royal assent
Long title
Employers' Indemnity Supplementation Fund Amendment Act 1993	No. 1 of 1993	19 July 1993
An Act to amend the Employers' Indemnity Supplementation Fund Act 1980 (Note: Employers' Indemnity Supplementation Fund Act 1980 (No. 80)) and to make consequential amendments to the Workers' Compensation and Rehabilitation Act 1981. (Note: Workers' Compensation and Assistance Act 1981 (No. 86))
City of Perth Restructuring Act 1993	No. 38 of 1993	20 December 1993
An Act to dissolve the council of the City of Perth, to divide the district of the City of Perth into 4 districts being the City of Perth and 3 new municipalities and to provide for elections of councils for them, and for related matters.
	No. X of 1993	
Regional Development Commissions Act 1993	No. 53 of 1993	22 December 1993
An Act to establish regional development commissions to co-ordinate and promote the economic development of regions of Western Australia, to provide for the establishment of regional development advisory committees, to establish a Regional Development Council, to continue existing regional development bodies as commissions under this Act, to repeal certain Acts and for related purposes.

== Sources ==
- "legislation.wa.gov.au".
