= List of acts of the Parliament of Victoria from 1863 =

This is a list of acts of the Parliament of Victoria, Australia for the year 1863.

== 1863 ==
Continuing the second session of the third parliament of Victoria.

| Short title, or popular name | Citation | Royal assent |
Long title
| Provident Institute Estate Act 1863 | 26 Vict. No. 163 | 19 February 1863 |
An Act for the better enabling the Assignees of the Insolvent Estate of the Provident Institute of Victoria to collect and administer the same for the benefit of the Creditors of such Company and to vest the said estate in the said Assignees with power to sell and give discharges for monies received by them and for other purposes the short title of which is "The Provident Institute Estate Act."
| | 26 Vict. No. 164 | 19 February 1863 |
An Act to suspend the operation of certain Enactments relating to Registration of Parliamentary Electors. (Repealed by Electoral Act 1863 (27 Vict. No. 168))
| | 26 Vict. No. 165 | 1 April 1863 |
An Act to apply out of the Consolidated Revenue the sum of Five hundred thousand pounds (Note: £500,000 in 1863 is equivalent to A$72,000,000 in 2022.) to the service of the year One thousand eight hundred and sixty-three.
| | 26 Vict. No. 166 | 10 April 1863 (Note: This act was reserved for approval by Her Majesty.) |
An Act to amend the Law relating to Aliens. (Repealed by Aliens Statute 1865 (28 Vict. No. 256))
| | 26 Vict. No. 167 | 30 June 1863 |
An Act to make better provision for the Punishment of Frauds committed by Trustees Bankers and other Persons intrusted with Property. (Repealed by Statute of Trusts 1864 (28 Vict. No. 234))
| Electoral Act 1863 (repealed) | 27 Vict. No. 168 | 30 June 1863 |
An Act to amend the Law relating to the Qualifications and Registration of Electors of Members to serve in Parliament and to regulate proceedings at Parliamentary Elections. (Repealed by Electoral Act 1865 (29 Vict. No. 279))
| | 26 Vict. No. 169 | 30 June 1863 |
An Act to further amend the Laws relating to the Customs. (Repealed by Customs Act 1883 (47 Vict. No. 768))
| | 26 Vict. No. 170 | 30 June 1863 |
An Act to amend an Act intituled "An Act to consolidate and amend the Laws affecting the Chinese emigrating to and resident in Victoria." (Note: 22 Vict. No. 80) (Repealed by Chinese Immigration Statute 1864 (27 Vict. No. 200))
| | 26 Vict. No. 171 | 30 June 1863 |
An Act for the Improvement of the Municipal District of East Collingwood in the Colony of Victoria.
| | 26 Vict. No. 172 | 5 August 1863 |
An Act to apply out of the Consolidated Revenue the sum of Ninety-two thousand pounds (Note: £920,000 in 1863 is equivalent to A$72,000,000 in 2022.) to the service of the year One thousand eight hundred and sixty-two and the further sum of Five hundred thousand pounds to the service of the year One thousand eight hundred and sixty-three.
| | 26 Vict. No. 173 | 2 September 1863 |
An Act to remove doubts as to the validity of acts done by John George Forbes Esquire as Commissioner of Insolvent Estates for the Geelong Circuit District. (Repealed by Insolvency Statute 1865 (28 Vict. No. 273))
| Passage Brokers Act 1863 (repealed) | 27 Vict. No. 174 | 2 September 1863 |
An Act to regulate the Passenger Trade of Victoria. (Repealed by Passengers Harbors and Navigation Statute 1865 (28 Vict. No. 255))
| | 26 Vict. No. 175 | 2 September 1863 |
An Act to regulate Immigration into Victoria. (Repealed by Immigration Statute 1864 (27 Vict. No. 195))
| Road Districts and Shires Act 1863 (repealed) | 26 Vict. No. 176 | 2 September 1863 |
An Act to establish Road Districts and Shires and generally to provide for the administration of local affairs without the limits of Boroughs. (Repealed by Local Government Act 1874 (38 Vict. No. 506)
| Adulteration of Food Act 1863 (repealed) | 27 Vict. No. 177 | 2 September 1863 |
An Act to prevent the Adulteration of Articles of Food or Drink. (Repealed by Public Health Statute 1865 (28 Vict. No. 264))
| | 26 Vict. No. 178 | 2 September 1863 |
An Act to further alter and amend the Laws relating to the Corporations of the City of Melbourne and of the Town of Geelong respectively and to extend and apply other existing Acts thereto.
| | 26 Vict. No. 179 | 9 September 1863 |
An Act to exempt certain Contracts from the Law of Partnerships. (Repealed by Partnership Act 1890 (54 Vict. No. 1122))
| | 26 Vict. No. 180 | 9 September 1863 |
An Act to amend the Real Property Act. (Note: Real Property Act 1862 (25 Vict. No. 140)) (Repealed by Transfer of Land Statute 1866 (29 Vict. No. 301))
| Electoral Act Amendment Act 1863 (repealed) | 27 Vict. No. 181 | 11 September 1863 |
An Act to amend "The Electoral Act 1863." (Note: Electoral Act 1863 (27 Vict. No. 168)) (Repealed by Electoral Act 1865 (29 Vict. No. 279))
| Mercantile Law Amendment Act 1863 (repealed) | 27 Vict. No. 182 | 11 September 1863 |
An Act for the Amendment of the Mercantile Law. (Repealed by Common Law Procedure Statute 1865 (28 Vict. No. 274))
| Volunteer Act 1863 (repealed) | 27 Vict. No. 183 | 11 September 1863 |
An Act to amend the Law relating to Volunteer Corps. (Repealed by Volunteer Statute 1864 (27 Vict. No. 205))
| Municipal Corporations Act 1863 (repealed) | 27 Vict. No. 184 | 11 September 1863 |
An Act to Consolidate and Amend the Laws relating to Municipal Institutions. (Repealed by Boroughs Statute 1869 (33 Vict. No. 359))
| | 26 Vict. No. 185 | 11 September 1863 |
An Act to reduce the Expenses of Proceedings in the Supreme Court at Common Law. (Repealed by Common Law Procedure Statute 1865 (28 Vict. No. 274))
| Railways Act 1863 (repealed) | 27 Vict. No. 186 | 11 September 1863 |
An Act for the better management of Railways. (Repealed by Public Works Statute 1865 (29 Vict. No. 289))
| | 27 Vict. No. 187 | 11 September 1863 |
An Act to apply a sum out of the Consolidated Revenue to the Service of the year One thousand eight hundred and sixty-three and to appropriate the Supplies granted in this Session of Parliament and for other purposes.

== Sources ==
- "1863 Victorian Historical Acts". AustLII.
