= List of acts of the Parliament of Victoria from 1870 =

This is a list of acts of the Parliament of Victoria, Australia for the year 1870.

== 1870 ==
The third session of the sixth parliament of Victoria.

Short title, or popular name	Citation	Royal assent
Long title
	33 Vict. No. 361	10 March 1870
An Act to apply out of the Consolidated Revenue the sum of Six thousand seven hundred and ninety-five pounds eight shillings and nine pence (Note: £6,795 8s 9d in 1870 is equivalent to A$1,100,000 in 2022.) to the service of the year One thousand eight hundred and sixty-nine, and the sum of Five hundred thousand pounds (Note: £500,000 in 1870 is equivalent to A$78,600,000 in 2022.) to the service of the year One thousand eight hundred and seventy.
	33 Vict. No. 362	24 March 1870
An Act for granting an annuity to Lady Darling and for settling a sum of money upon certain trusts for the benefit of her children.
	33 Vict. No. 363	
An Act to sanction the issue and expenditure of certain sums from "The Public Works Loan Account" for Salaries, Wages, and Contingencies for the service of the year One thousand eight hundred and seventy.
	33 Vict. No. 364	26 May 1870
An Act to apply out of the Consolidated Revenue the sum of Five thousand and nineteen pounds twelve shillings and six pence (Note: £5,019 12s 6d in 1870 is equivalent to A$800,000 in 2022.) to the service of the year One thousand eight hundred and sixty-nine, and Two hundred and eighty thousand pounds (Note: £280,000 in 1870 is equivalent to A$44,000,000 in 2022.) to the service of the year One thousand eight hundred and seventy.
Abattoirs Amending Statute 1870 (repealed)	33 Vict. No. 365	2 June 1870
An Act to amend an Act intituled "An Act to amend the Laws relating to Abattoirs and the Slaughtering of Cattle." (Note: Abattoirs Statute 1869 (33 Vict. No. 356)) (Repealed by Butchers and Abattoirs Act 1890 (54 Vict. No. 1069))
	33 Vict. No. 366	2 June 1870
An Act to apply out of the Consolidated Revenue the sum of Seven hundred and fifty thousand pounds (Note: £750,000 in 1870 is equivalent to A$118,000,000 in 2022.) to the service of the year One thousand eight hundred and seventy.
	34 Vict. No. 367	15 July 1870
An Act to apply a sum out of the Consolidated Revenue to the services of the year One thousand eight hundred and seventy and to appropriate the Supplies granted in this session of Parliament and for other purposes.
	34 Vict. No. 368	15 July 1870
An Act to sanction the issue and application of certain Sums of Money from "The Railway Loan Account," for Salaries Wages and Contingencies for the Service of the year One thousand eight hundred and seventy.
Census Act 1871 (Note: Although given a short title ending '...Act 1871', this act was passed in the year 1870.)	34 Vict. No. 369	15 July 1870
An Act for taking an account of the Population and of the Live Stock in the year One thousand eight hundred and seventy-one.
Scab Act 1870 (repealed)	34 Vict. No. 370	15 July 1870
An Act for the prevention of the Scab in Sheep. (Repealed by Stock Diseases Act 1890 (54 Vict. No. 1141))
	34 Vict. No. 371	15 July 1870
An Act to authorize the raising of Money for Public Works and other purposes.
	34 Vict. No. 372	15 July 1870
An Act to amend the "Mining Companies Limited Liability Act 1864" (Note: Mining Companies Limited Liability Act 1864 (27 Vict. No. 228)) and for other purposes. (Repealed by Mines Act 1890 (54 Vict. No. 1120))
Amending Boroughs Statute 1870 (repealed)	34 Vict. No. 373	15 July 1870
An Act to amend an Act intituled "An Act to amend and consolidate the Laws relating to Municipal Corporations." (Note: Boroughs Statute 1869 (33 Vict. No. 359)) (Repealed by Local Government Act 1874 (38 Vict. No. 506)
	34 Vict. No. 374	15 July 1870
An Act to extend the Powers of the Acting Inspector-General of Public Works.
Waterworks Commissioners Amended Act 1870 (repealed)	34 Vict. No. 375	15 July 1870
An Act for amending "The Waterworks Commissioners Act 1869." (Note: Waterworks Commissioners Act 1869 (33 Vict. No. 347)) (Repealed by Waterworks Act 1880 (44 Vict. No. 656))
	34 Vict. No. 376	15 July 1870
An Act to sanction the issue and expenditure of certain sums from "The Public Works Loan Account" for Salaries Wages and Contingencies for the service of the year One thousand eight hundred and seventy.

The fourth session of the sixth parliament of Victoria.

Short title, or popular name	Citation	Royal assent
Long title
	34 Vict. No. 377	29 December 1870
An Act to apply a sum out of the Consolidated Revenue to the service of the year One thousand eight hundred and seventy-one, and to appropriate the supplies granted in this Session of Parliament and for other purposes.
	34 Vict. No. 378	29 December 1870
An Act to amend the "Real Property Statute 1864." (Note: Real Property Statute 1864 (27 Vict. No. 213)) (Repealed by Real Property Act 1890 (54 Vict. No. 1136))
Insolvency Statute 1871 (Note: Although given a short title ending '...Statute 1871', this act was passed in the year 1870.) (repealed)	34 Vict. No. 379	29 December 1870
An Act to amend the Law relating to Insolvents and their Estates. (Repealed by Insolvency Act 1890 (54 Vict. No. 1102))
	34 Vict. No. 380	29 December 1870
An Act to Repeal the Act intituled "An Act for the Establishment of a Board of Agriculture." (Note: 22 Vict. No. 83)
	34 Vict. No. 381	29 December 1870
An Act for enabling the Council of the Shire of Ararat to erect a Shire Hall and buildings connected therewith, and to purchase land for such purpose. (Repealed by Statute Law Revision Act 1984 (No. 10087))
	34 Vict. No. 382	29 December 1870
An Act to sanction the issue and expenditure of certain sums from "The Public Works Loan Account" for Salaries Wages and Contingencies for the service of the year One thousand eight hundred and seventy-one.
	34 Vict. No. 383	29 December 1870
An Act to provide for reimbursing Members of the Legislative Council and of the Legislative Assembly their expenses in relation to their attendance in Parliament.
Married Women's Property Act 1870 (repealed)	34 Vict. No. 384	29 December 1870
An Act to amend the Law relating to the Property of Married Women. (Repealed by Married Women's Property Act 1884 (48 Vict. No. 828))
Contractors Debts Act 1870 (repealed)	34 Vict. No. 385	29 December 1870
An Act for better securing the payment of Debts due to Workmen. (Repealed by Employers and Employés Act 1890 (54 Vict. No. 1087))
	34 Vict. No. 386	29 December 1870
An Act to sanction the issue and application of certain Sums of Money from "The Railway Loan Account,"' for Salaries Wages and Contingencies for the Service of the years One thousand eight hundred and seventy and One thousand eight hundred and seventy-one.
Shires Statute Amendment Act 1870 (repealed)	34 Vict. No. 387	29 December 1870
An Act to amend the "Shires Statute" (Note: Shires Statute 1869 (33 Vict. No. 358)) and for other purposes. (Repealed by Local Government Act 1874 (38 Vict. No. 506)
Duties on the Estates of Deceased Persons Statute 1870 (repealed)	34 Vict. No. 388	29 December 1870
An Act to enforce and collect Duties on the Estates of Deceased Persons. (Repealed by Administration and Probate Act 1890 (54 Vict. No. 1160))
Discipline Act 1870 (repealed)	34 Vict. No. 389	29 December 1870
An Act to provide for the Regulation and Discipline of the Military and Naval Forces in the service of Her Majesty's Government in Victoria. (Repealed by Defences and Discipline Act 1890 (54 Vict. No. 1083))
Wines Beer and Spirits Sale Statute 1864 Amendment Act 1870 (repealed)	34 Vict. No. 390	29 December 1870
An Act to amend "The Wines Beer and Spirits Sale Statute 1864." (Note: Wines Beer and Spirit Sale Statute 1864 (27 Vict. No. 227)) (Repealed by Licensing Act 1876 (40 Vict. No. 566))

== Sources ==
- "1870 Victorian Historical Acts". AustLII.
