= List of ordinances of the Legislative Council of Western Australia from 1847 =

This is a list of ordinances of the Legislative Council of Western Australia for the year 1847.

== 1847 ==
Short title, or popular name	Citation	Royal assent
Long title
	10 Vict. No. 1	3 June 1847
An Ordinance to renew certain Acts appointing Places for the Landing of Goods within the Limits of Towns not being seaport Towns.
	10 Vict. No. 2	29 July 1847
An Ordinance to amend and make perpetual the present Laws relative to Auctioneers and Auction Duties.
	10 Vict. No. 3	29 July 1847
An Ordinance for applying certain Sums arising from the Revenue receivable in the Colony of Western Australia to the service thereof, for the Financial Year commencing First of April, One thousand eight hundred and forty-seven; and for the further appropriating the said Revenue. (Repealed by Statute Law Revision Act 1964 (13 Eliz. II. No. 61))
	10 Vict. No. 4	5 August 1847
An Ordinance to make perpetual an Act entitled "An Act to facilitate actions against Persons absent from the Colony, and against Persons sued as Joint Contractors." (Note: 6 Vict. No. 4)
	10 Vict. No. 5	5 August 1847
An Ordinance to provide further remedies for the annoyance arising from dogs.
	10 Vict. No. 6	5 August 1847
An Ordinance to provide for the withdrawal of Letters from the Post Office in certain cases.
	10 Vict. No. 7	5 August 1847
An Ordinance to amend the Laws relating to Publicans' Licenses.
Imperial Act Adopting Ordinance 1847	10 Vict. No. 8	5 August 1847
An Ordinance to adopt certain Improvements made in the Law of England respecting Libel.
	10 Vict. No. 9	5 August 1847
An Ordinance to authorise the sale of Wines in smaller quantities than those hitherto appointed by Law.
	10 Vict. No. 10	5 August 1847
An Ordinance to amend an Act entitled "An Act to provide for the Improvement of Towns in the Colony of Western Australia." (Note: 4 & 5 Vict. No. 18)
	10 Vict. No. 11	12 August 1847
An Ordinance to Exempt certain Goods from Duties.
	10 Vict. No. 12	12 August 1847
An Ordinance to provide for the establishment of proper places for the Burial of the Dead.
	10 Vict. No. 13	2 September 1847
An Ordinance to provide further remedies against Trespasses by Live Stock, and to promote the construction of Fences. (Repealed by Cattle Trespass Ordinance 1857 (21 Vict. No. 7))
	10 Vict. No. 14	2 September 1847
An Ordinance for improving the Law of Evidence.
	10 Vict. No. 15	2 September 1847
An Ordinance to diminish the Dangers resulting from Bush Fires.
	10 Vict. No. 16	2 September 1847
An Ordinance to provide a Summary Remedy for Breach of Contracts connected with the Fisheries of the Colony.
	10 Vict. No. 17	2 September 1847
An Ordinance to amend an Act entitled "An Act to provide for the Registration of Births, Deaths, and Marriages, in the Colony of Western Australia." (Note: 4 & 5 Vict. No. 9)
	10 Vict. No. 18	9 November 1847
An Ordinance to repeal the existing Laws respecting the Solemnization of Matrimony; and to make other regulations respecting the same.
	10 Vict. No. 19	4 November 1847
An Ordinance to repeal the existing Laws respecting the Construction and Management of Roads, and to establish a Central Board of Works.
	10 Vict. No. 20	4 November 1847
An Ordinance to establish a Toll to be levied upon Sandal Wood, to be applied to the Construction and Repair of Public Roads and Lines of Communication.

== Sources ==
- "legislation.wa.gov.au".
