= List of acts of the Parliament of Western Australia from 2020 =

This is a list of acts of the Parliament of Western Australia for the year 2020.

== 2020 ==
Short title, or popular name	Citation	Royal assent
Long title
Railway (METRONET) Amendment Act 2020	No. 1 of 2020	27 February 2020
An Act to amend the Railway (METRONET) Act 2018. (Note: Railway (METRONET) Act 2018 (No. 34))
	No. X of 2020	
National Disability Insurance Scheme (Worker Screening) Act 2020	No. 48 of 2020	9 December 2020
An Act to provide for the screening of workers in connection with the operation of the National Disability Insurance Scheme and to amend certain other Acts as a consequence of this Act.

== Sources ==
- "legislation.wa.gov.au".
