= List of ordinances of the Legislative Council of Western Australia from 1842 =

This is a list of ordinances of the Legislative Council of Western Australia for the year 1842.

== 1842 ==
Short title, or popular name	Citation	Royal assent
Long title
	6 Vict. No. 1	20 July 1842
An Act to regulate the Slaughtering of Cattle and other Stock in Towns. (Repealed by 16 Vict. No. 7)
	6 Vict. No. 2	21 July 1842
An Act to make perpetual an Act entitled "An Act to provide a remedy against Horses and other Live Stock straying in Towns, and to prevent Entire Horses and Bulls straying in any part of the Colony." (Note: 3 Vict. No. 3)
	6 Vict. No. 3	21 July 1842
An Act to impose a Duty on all Goods imported into Western Australia, and not already subject to duty.
	6 Vict. No. 4	11 August 1842
An Act to facilitate actions against Persons absent from the Colony, and against Persons sued as Joint Contractors.
	6 Vict. No. 5	25 August 1842
An Act to provide a summary remedy in certain cases of Breach of Contract.
	6 Vict. No. 6	25 August 1842
An Act to prevent the unauthorised Occupation of Crown Lands.
	6 Vict. No. 7	25 August 1842
An Act to explain and amend certain Acts now in force relating to the Building of Churches, Chapels and Ministers' Dwellings
	6 Vict. No. 8	10 September 1842
An Act to regulate the Apprenticeship and otherwise to provide for the Guardianship and Control of a certain class of Juvenile Immigrants.
	6 Vict. No. 9	21 July 1842
An Act for applying certain Sums arising from the Revenue receivable in the colony of Western Australia to the service thereof, for the financial Year commencing First of April, One thousand eight hundred and forty-three. (Repealed by Statute Law Revision Act 1964 (13 Eliz. II. No. 61))
	6 Vict. No. 10	15 September 1842
An act to amend and continue for a limited period an Act entitled "An Act to regulate the Licensing of Auctioneers and the Collection of Duties on Property sold by auction." (Note: 3 Vict. No. 1)
	6 Vict. No. 11	21 July 1842
An Act for the relief of Insolvent Debtors not in custody. (Repealed by Insolvent Ordinance 1856 (20 Vict. No. 10))
	6 Vict. No. 12	27 October 1842
An Ordinance to naturalize Franz Anthon Didrick Christian Helwich.
	6 Vict. No. 13	10 November 1842
An Act to establish and regulate Courts of Requests.
	6 Vict. No. 14	10 November 1842
An Act for the removal of the Nuisance caused by Herds of Wild Cattle in Western Australia.
	6 Vict. No. 15	10 November 1842
An Act to extend the Remedies of Creditors against the Property of Debtors.

== Sources ==
- "legislation.wa.gov.au".
