= List of acts of the Parliament of Victoria from 1861 =

This is a list of acts of the Parliament of Victoria, Australia for the year 1861.

== 1861 ==
The second session of the second parliament of Victoria.

| Short title, or popular name | Citation | Royal assent |
Long title
| Census Act 1861 | 24 Vict. No. 120 | 12 February 1861 |
An Act for taking an Account of the Population in 1861.
| | 24 Vict. No. 121 | 12 February 1861 |
An Act to remove doubts as to the extent of the power of the Governor to commute the sentence of Death. (Repealed by Criminal Law and Practice Statute 1864 (27 Vict. No. 233))
| | 24 Vict. No. 122 | 30 April 1861 |
An Act to continue an Act intituled "An Act to amend the Law relating to the more easy Recovery of certain Debts and Demands." (Note: 22 Vict. No. 76) (Repealed by Justices of the Peace Statute 1865 (28 Vict. No. 267))
| | 25 Vict. No. 123 | 30 April 1861 |
An Act to prevent the further spread of the disease in cattle called Pleuro-pneumonia.
| | 25 Vict. No. 124 | 3 July 1861 |
An Act to appropriate the Consolidated Revenue to the Service of the Year One thousand eight hundred and sixty-one and for other purposes.
| | 25 Vict. No. 125 | 3 July 1861 |
An Act to amend the Law relating to Divorce and Matrimonial Causes. (Repealed by Supreme Court Act 1890 (54 Vict. No. 1142))
| | 25 Vict. No. 126 | 3 July 1861 |
An Act to authorise the Melbourne and Essendon Railway Company to make a branch railway to the Racecourse and for other purposes.
| | 25 Vict. No. 127 | 3 July 1861 |
An Act to enable the St. Kilda and Brighton Railway Company to extend their Railway to the shore of Port Phillip Bay to make a deviation in their Main Line to construct a Pier and other works to raise further sums of Money to issue preference Shares and for other purposes. (Repealed by 42 Vict. No. 617)
| | 25 Vict. No. 128 | 3 July 1861 |
An Act to amend the Act intituled "An Act to limit the number of persons holding offices under the Crown who may sit and vote in the Legislative Council and Legislative Assembly of Victoria." (Note: 23 Vict. No. 91) (Repealed by Constitution Act Amendment Act 1890 (54 Vict. No. 1075))
| | 25 Vict. No. 129 | 3 July 1861 |
An Act to alter an enactment (Note: 21 Vict. No. 43) respecting the opening with a double line of rails of the Melbourne and Suburban Railway and to substitute another provision in lieu thereof. (Repealed by 42 Vict. No. 617)
| | 25 Vict. No. 130 | 3 July 1861 |
An Act to amend the Law relating to Pawnbrokers in the Colony of Victoria. (Repealed by Pawnbrokers Statute 1865 (28 Vict. No. 248))

== Sources ==
- "1861 Victorian Historical Acts". AustLII.
