= List of acts of the Parliament of Western Australia from 1910 =

This is a list of acts of the Parliament of Western Australia for the year 1910.

== 1910 ==
Short title, or popular name	Citation	Royal assent
Long title
	No. 1 of 1910	26 August 1910
An Act to apply out of the Consolidated Revenue Fund and from Moneys to Credit of the General Loan Fund and from the Loan Suspense Account the sum of One Million and Fifty-three Thousand Eight Hundred and Seventy-five Pounds to the Service of the Year ending 30th June, 1911.
	No. 2 of 1910	22 November 1910
An Act to apply out of the Consolidated Revenue Fund and from Moneys to Credit of the General Loan Fund and from the Loan Suspense Account the sum of Seven Hundred and Nineteen Thousand Four Hundred and Ten Pounds to the Service of the Year ending 30th June, 1911.
Geraldton Municipal Gas Supply Act 1910	No. 3 of 1910	22 November 1910
An Act to authorise the Municipality of Geraldton to acquire by purchase the Works of The Colonial Gas Association, Limited, and to supply Gas within the Municipal District, and to borrow money for the purchase of the said Works.
Agricultural Bank Act Amendment Act 1910	No. 4 of 1910	22 November 1910
An Act to further amend the Agricultural Bank Act, 1906. (Note: Agricultural Bank Act 1906 (No. 15))
General Loan and Inscribed Stock Act 1910	No. 5 of 1910	22 November 1910
An Act to consolidate and amend the Law relating to Loans authorised to be raised by the Government of Western Australia, and the creation and issue of Inscribed Stock and Debentures.
	No. 6 of 1910	22 December 1910
An Act to apply from the Loan Suspense Account the sum of Forty Thousand Pounds for the construction of the Southern Cross-Bullfinch Railway.
Pharmacy and Poisons Act Compilation Act 1910	No. 7 of 1910	22 December 1910
An Act compiling certain Acts of Parliament relating to Pharmacy and the Sale of Poisons.
Mount Lawley Reserves Act 1910	No. 8 of 1910	22 December 1910
An Act to vest certain Reserves at Mount Lawley in His Majesty, to change the purposes of such Reserves, and to classify them as Permanent Reserves of Class A.
Southern Cross–Bullfinch Railway Act 1910	No. 9 of 1910	22 December 1910
An Act to authorise the Construction of a Railway from Southern Cross to Bullfinch.
	No. 10 of 1910	23 December 1910
An Act to apply out of the Consolidated Revenue Fund the sum of Two Hundred and Seven Thousand Four Hundred and Forty-three Pounds to the Service of the Year ending 30th June, 1911.
Land Tax and Income Tax Act 1910	No. 11 of 1910	23 December 1910
An Act to impose a Land Tax and an Income Tax.

== Sources ==
- "legislation.wa.gov.au".
