= List of acts of the Legislative Council of Victoria from 1851 =

This is a list of acts of the Legislative Council of Victoria, Australia for the year 1851.

== 1851 ==
Short title, or popular name	Citation	Royal assent
Long title
	15 Vict. No. 1	24 December 1851
An Act to Interpret and Shorten the Language of Acts of Council. (Repealed by 21 Vict. No. 22)
	15 Vict. No. 2	24 December 1851
An Act to suspend for one year so much of the Acts to Incorporate the Inhabitants of the City of Melbourne and the Town of Geelong respectively as relates to the estimating and levying a rate for the Police of the same.
	15 Vict. No. 3	24 December 1851
An Act to regulate for a limited time the exportation of Gunpowder and munitions of War from the Colony of Victoria.
	15 Vict. No. 4	24 December 1851
An Act to regulate Distress and proceedings therein. (Repealed by Landlord and Tenant Statute 1864 (27 Vict. No. 192))
	15 Vict. No. 5	24 December 1851
An Act to alter an Act intituled "An Act further to amend an Act intituled an Act for the better preservation of the Ports Harbors Havens Roadsteads Channels Navigable Creeks and Rivers in New South Wales and the better regulation of Shipping in the same" (Note: 7 Vict. No. 12 (NSW)) and to provide for the rate of Pilotage in the several Harbors in the Colony of Victoria. (Repealed by 16 Vict. No. 12)
	15 Vict. No. 6	31 December 1851
An Act to abolish the taking of Fees for their own use by Officers in the Public Service in the Colony of Victoria. (Repealed by Public Service Act 1890 (54 Vict. No. 1133))
	15 Vict. No. 7	31 December 1851
An Act to incorporate the Board of Commissioners for National Education. (Repealed by 21 Vict. No. 149)
	15 Vict. No. 8	31 December 1851
An Act for applying certain Sums arising from the Revenue receivable in the Colony of Victoria to the Service thereof, for the year One thousand eight hundred and fifty-two, and for further appropriating the said Revenue.

== Sources ==
- "1851 Victorian Historical Acts". AustLII.
