= List of acts of the Parliament of Victoria from 1878 =

This is a list of acts of the Parliament of Victoria, Australia for the year 1878.

== 1878 ==
Continuing the first session of the ninth parliament of Victoria.

Short title, or popular name	Citation	Royal assent
Long title
Duties of Customs Act 1877 (Note: Although given a short title ending '...Act 1877', this act was passed in the year 1878.) (repealed)	41 Vict. No. 593	18 January 1878
An Act for granting to Her Majesty certain Duties of Customs and for repealing and altering certain other Duties. (Repealed by Customs Act 1883 (47 Vict. No. 768) and Duties of Customs Act 1883 (47 Vict. No. 769))
	41 Vict. No. 594	18 January 1878
An Act for the amendment and continuation of an Expiring Law. (Note: Drawbacks Act 1872 (36 Vict. No. 434)) (Repealed by Customs Act 1890 (54 Vict. No. 1081))
Diseases in Vines Act 1877 (repealed)	41 Vict. No. 595	18 January 1878
An Act for the Eradication of Diseases in Vines. (Repealed by Phylloxera Vine Disease Act 1880 (44 Vict. No. 684))
Drainage of Mines Act 1877 (repealed)	41 Vict. No. 596	18 January 1878
An Act to amend the Law relating to the Drainage of Mines. (Repealed by Mines Act 1890 (54 Vict. No. 1120))
	41 Vict. No. 597	19 February 1878
An Act to amend "The Customs Act 1857." (Note: Customs Act 1857 (21 Vict. No. 13)) (Repealed by Customs Act 1883 (47 Vict. No. 768))
	41 Vict. No. 598	
An Act to further amend "The Passengers Harbors and Navigation Statute 1865." (Note: Passengers Harbors and Navigation Statute 1865 (28 Vict. No. 255)) (Repealed by Marine Act 1890 (54 Vict. No. 1165))
	41 Vict. No. 599	
An Act to apply a sum out of the consolidated revenue to the service of the year ending on the last day of June One thousand eight hundred and seventy-eight, and to appropriate the Supplies granted in this session of Parliament.
	41 Vict. No. 600	9 April 1878
An Act for the continuation of an Expiring Law. (Note: 34 Vict. No. 383)
	41 Vict. No. 601	9 April 1878
An Act to validate a Rate and for other purposes.

The second session of the ninth parliament of Victoria.

Short title, or popular name	Citation	Royal assent
Long title
	42 Vict. No. 602	17 July 1878
An Act to apply out of the Consolidated Revenue the sum of Nine hundred thousand pounds to the service of the year One thousand eight hundred and seventy-eight and nine.
Goulburn Valley Railway Construction Act 1878	42 Vict. No. 603	1 August 1878
An Act to authorize the Construction by the State of a Line of Railway to be called the Goulburn Valley Railway.
South Yarra and Oakleigh Railway Construction Act 1878	42 Vict. No. 604	26 August 1878
An Act to authorize the Construction by the State of a Line of Railway from South Yarra to Oakleigh.
Bills of Exchange Act 1878 (repealed)	42 Vict. No. 605	26 August 1878
An Act to explain "The Instruments and Securities Statute 1864." (Note: Instruments and Securities Statute 1864 (27 Vict. No. 204)) (Repealed by Bills of Exchange Act 1883 (47 Vict. No. 772))
	42 Vict. No. 606	9 September 1878
An Act to amend "The Railway Construction Act 1877" (Note: Railway Construction Act 1877 (41 Vict. No. 580)) so far as it relates to the construction of the Daylesford Railway.
	42 Vict. No. 607	13 September 1878
An Act to sanction the issue and expenditure of certain sums from "The Public Works Loan Account 1872" for Salaries Wages and Contingencies for the service of the year ending the Thirtieth day of June One thousand eight hundred and seventy-nine.
Railway Loan Act 1878	42 Vict. No. 608	30 September 1878
An Act to authorize the raising of Money for Railways and for other purposes.
	42 Vict. No. 609	3 October 1878
An Act to apply out of the Consolidated Revenue the sum of Six hundred and thirteen thousand pounds to the service of the year One thousand eight hundred and seventy-eight and nine.
	42 Vict. No. 610	3 October 1878
An Act to amend "The Transfer of Land Statute" (Note: Transfer of Land Statute 1866 (29 Vict. No. 301)) with regard to Easements. (Repealed by Transfer of Land Act 1890 (54 Vict. No. 1149))
Stock Conversion Act 1878	42 Vict. No. 611	21 October 1878
An Act to authorize the Conversion of Victorian Government Stock into Debentures.
Felons Apprehension Act 1878	42 Vict. No. 612	1 November 1878
An Act to facilitate the taking or apprehending of persons charged with certain felonies and the punishment of those by whom they are harbored.
	42 Vict. No. 613	
An Act to vest a piece of land situate in the city of Ballarat reserved for public gardens in the Minister of Public Instruction.
Rosstown Junction Railway Act 1878 (repealed)	42 Vict. No. 614	14 November 1878
An Act to authorize the Construction of the Rosstown Junction Railway and for other purposes. (Repealed by Rosstown Junction Railway Abandonment Act 1916 (7 Geo. V. No. 2880))
Expiring Laws Continuance Act 1878	42 Vict. No. 615	14 November 1878
An Act to continue various Expiring Laws.
Diseases in Vines Act Amendment Act 1878 (repealed)	42 Vict. No. 616	14 November 1878
An Act to amend and continue "The Diseases in Vines Act 1877." (Note: Diseases in Vines Act 1877 (41 Vict. No. 595)) (Repealed by Phylloxera Vine Disease Act 1880 (44 Vict. No. 684))
	42 Vict. No. 617	14 November 1878
An Act to authorize the Melbourne and Hobson's Bay United Railway Company to sell their undertaking and property and to vest the same in the Board of Land and Works and for other purposes.
Lien of Crops Act 1878 (repealed)	42 Vict. No. 618	14 November 1878
An Act to permit Liens to be given upon growing Crops. (Repealed by Instruments Act 1890 (54 Vict. No. 1103))
Victorian Exhibitions Act 1878 (repealed)	42 Vict. No. 619	14 November 1878
An Act to provide for the holding of Victorian Exhibitions. (Repealed by Exhibitions Act 1890 (54 Vict. No. 1089))
Bankers' Books Evidence Act 1878 (repealed)	42 Vict. No. 620	14 November 1878
An Act to amend the Law with reference to Bankers' Books Evidence. (Repealed by Evidence Act 1890 (54 Vict. No. 1088))
	42 Vict. No. 621	14 November 1878
An Act to amend "The Juries Statute 1876." (Note: Juries Statute 1876 (40 Vict. No. 560))
Fisheries Act Amendment Act 1878 (repealed)	42 Vict. No. 622	14 November 1878
An Act to amend the "Fisheries Act 1873." (Note: Fisheries Act 1873 (37 Vict. No. 473)) (Repealed by Fisheries Act 1890 (54 Vict. No. 1093))
	42 Vict. No. 623	21 November 1878
An Act to sanction the issue and application of a certain Sum of Money from "The Railway Loan Liquidation and Construction Account" established under the provision of section forty-two of 33 Vict. No. 360. (Note: 33 Vict. No. 360)
Duties of Customs Act Amendment Act 1878 (repealed)	42 Vict. No. 624	21 November 1878
An Act to amend "The Duties of Customs Act 1877." (Note: Duties of Customs Act 1877 (41 Vict. No. 593)) (Repealed by Customs Act 1883 (47 Vict. No. 768))
Successory Trusts Act 1878 (repealed)	42 Vict. No. 625	28 November 1878
An Act to vest Property held on Public, Religious, and Charitable Trusts in the succeeding Trustees without Conveyance or Assignment, and for other purposes. (Repealed by Trusts Act 1890 (54 Vict. No. 1150))
Neglected and Criminal Children's Amendment Act 1878 (repealed)	42 Vict. No. 626	28 November 1878
An Act to further amend the Law relating to Neglected and Criminal Children. (Repealed by Juvenile Offenders Act 1887 (51 Vict. No. 951))
	42 Vict. No. 627	28 November 1878
An Act to abolish forfeitures for Treason and Felony and to otherwise amend the Law relating thereto. (Repealed by Crimes Act 1890 (54 Vict. No. 1079))
	42 Vict. No. 628	28 November 1878
An Act to amend the Lunacy Statute. (Note: Lunacy Statute 1867 (31 Vict. No. 309)) (Repealed by Lunacy Act 1890 (54 Vict. No. 1113))
	42 Vict. No. 629	28 November 1878
An Act to sanction the issue and application of a certain Sum of Money under "The Railway Loan Act 1878." (Note: Railway Loan Act 1878 (42 Vict. No. 608))
	42 Vict. No. 630 (Note: Originally numbered No. 632 on the authenticated vellum copy; numbering altered to No. 630 by act 43 Vict. No. 649.)	2 December 1878
An Act to amend "The Police Offences Statute 1865." (Note: Police Offences Statute 1865 (28 Vict. No. 265)) (Repealed by Police Offences Act 1890 (54 Vict. No. 1126))
Conservation of Public Health Act 1878 (repealed)	42 Vict. No. 631 (Note: Originally numbered No. 630 on the authenticated vellum copy; numbering altered to No. 631 by act 43 Vict. No. 649.)	2 December 1878
An Act for the Conservation of Public Health. (Repealed by Health Act 1890 (54 Vict. No. 1098))
	42 Vict. No. 632 (Note: Originally numbered No. 631 on the authenticated vellum copy; numbering altered to No. 632 by act 43 Vict. No. 649.)	2 December 1878
An Act to annul to a certain extent the operation and effect of an Order in Council reserving from sale permanently the Public Reserve known as the Albert Park and to vest part of the land thereby reserved in the Minister of Public Instruction. (Repealed by Statute Law Revision Act 1984 (No. 10087))
	42 Vict. No. 633	6 December 1878
An Act to apply a sum out of the Consolidated Revenue to the service of the year ending on the last day of June One thousand eight hundred and seventy-nine and to appropriate the Supplies granted in this Session of Parliament.
Land Act 1878 (repealed)	42 Vict. No. 634	6 December 1878
An Act to amend "The Land Act 1869." (Note: Land Act 1869 (33 Vict. No. 360)) (Repealed by Land Act 1884 (48 Vict. No. 812)

== Sources ==
- "1878 Victorian Historical Acts". AustLII.
