= List of acts of the Parliament of Western Australia from 1930 =

This is a list of acts of the Parliament of Western Australia for the year 1930.

== 1930 ==
Short title, or popular name	Citation	Royal assent
Long title
Public Service Appeal Board Act Amendment Act 1929	No. 1 of 1930	6 January 1930
An Act to amend the Public Service Appeal Board Act, 1920. (Note: Public Service Appeal Board Act 1920 (No. 14))
High School Act Amendment Act 1930	No. 2 of 1930	23 October 1930
An Act to amend the High School Aet, 1876. (Note: High School Aet, 1876 (40 Vict. No. 8))
Main Roads Act 1930	No. 5 of 1930	19 November 1930
An Act to consolidate and amend the law relating to and making provision for the construction, maintenance, and supervision of Main and Developmental Roads, and for other relative purposes.
University Buildings Act 1930	No. 37 of 1930	22 December 1930
An Act to authorise the expenditure by the Senate of the University of Western Australia out of certain trust moneys known as the Hackett Bequest of the amount required for the erection and completion of certain buildings at Crawley, and to provide for the grant by the State of an annuity sufficient to reimburse the University and for other incidental purposes.
	No. X of 1930	
Road Districts Act Amendment Act 1930	No. 50 of 1930	30 December 1930
An Act to amend section two hundred and fifty-four of the Road Districts Act, 1919. (Note: Road Districts Act 1919 (No. 38))

== Sources ==
- "legislation.wa.gov.au".
