= List of acts of the Parliament of Western Australia from 2021 =

This is a list of acts of the Parliament of Western Australia for the year 2021.

== 2021 ==
Short title, or popular name	Citation	Royal assent
Long title
COVID-19 Response Legislation Amendment (Extension of Expiring Provisions) Act 2021	No. 1 of 2021	2 June 2021
An Act to amend the following to extend the operation of provisions relating to the COVID-19 pandemic—: The Criminal Code; the Criminal Code Amendment (COVID-19 Response) Act 2020; (Note: Criminal Code Amendment (COVID-19 Response) Act 2020 (No. 8)); the Emergency Management Amendment (COVID-19 Response) Act 2020. (Note: Emergency Management Amendment (COVID-19 Response) Act 2020 (No. 11))
Supply Act 2021	No. 5 of 2021	25 June 2021
An Act to apply out of the Consolidated Account the amount of $15 108 098 500 for the services and purposes of the year ending 30 June 2022.
COVID-19 Response Legislation Amendment (Extension of Expiring Provisions) Act (No. 2) 2021	No. 21 of 2021	24 November 2021
An Act to amend the following to extend the operation of provisions relating to the COVID-19 pandemic—: The Criminal Code; the Criminal Code Amendment (COVID-19 Response) Act 2020; the Emergency Management Amendment (COVID-19 Response) Act 2020.
Appropriation (Recurrent 2021-22) Act 2021	No. 22 of 2021	3 December 2021
An Act to grant supply and to appropriate and apply out of the Consolidated Account certain sums for the recurrent services and purposes of the year ending 30 June 2022.
Appropriation (Capital 2021-22) Act 2021	No. 23 of 2021	3 December 2021
An Act to grant supply and to appropriate and apply out of the Consolidated Account certain sums for the capital purposes of the year ending 30 June 2022.
Aboriginal Cultural Heritage Act 2021	No. 27 of 2021	22 December 2021
An Act —: about Aboriginal cultural heritage; and; to repeal the Aboriginal Heritage Act 1972 (Note: Aboriginal Heritage Act 1972 (No. 53)) and the Aboriginal Heritage (Marandoo) Act 1992; (Note: Aboriginal Heritage (Marandoo) Act 1992 (No. 2)) and; to make consequential and other amendments to various Acts; and; for related purposes.
	No. X of 2021	
Industrial Relations Legislation Amendment Act 2021	No. 30 of 2021	22 December 2021
An Act—: to amend the Industrial Relations Act 1979, (Note: Industrial Arbitration Act 1979 (No. 114)) the Courts and Tribunals (Electronic Processes Facilitation) Act 2013, (Note: Courts and Tribunals (Electronic Processes Facilitation) Act 2013 (No. 20)) the Long Service Leave Act 1958, (Note: Long Service Leave Act 1958 (No. 44)) the Minimum Conditions of Employment Act 1993 (Note: Minimum Conditions of Employment Act 1993 (No. 14)) and the Public and Bank Holidays Act 1972; (Note: Public and Bank Holidays Act 1972 (No. 63)) and; to make consequential amendments to the Work Health and Safety Act 2020. (Note: Work Health and Safety Act 2020 (No. 36))

== Sources ==
- "legislation.wa.gov.au".
