= List of acts of the Parliament of Western Australia from 1957 =

This is a list of acts of the Parliament of Western Australia for the year 1957.

== 1957 ==
Short title, or popular name	Citation	Royal assent
Long title
	No. 1 of 1957	9 August 1957
An Act to apply out of the Consolidated Revenue Fund the sum of Fifteen Million Pounds and from Moneys to Credit of the General Loan Fund Four Million Pounds, to the Service of the Year ending 30th June, 1958, and to apply out of the Public Account the sum of Two Million Pounds for the purpose of temporary Advances to be made by the Treasurer.
Agriculture Protection Board Act Amendment Act 1957	No. 2 of 1957	19 August 1957
An Act to amend the Agriculture Protection Board Act, 1950-1956. (Note: Agriculture Protection Board Act 1950 (No. 76))
Midland Junction–Welshpool Railway Act 1957	No. 62 of 1957	6 December 1957
An Act to authorise the Construction of a Railway from Midland Junction to Welshpool.
Metropolitan (Perth) Passenger Transport Trust Act 1957	No. 71 of 1957	10 December 1957
An Act for the Purposes of Constituting a Body Corporate with the Functions of Providing, Maintaining, Protecting, and Managing, Efficient Passenger Transport Facilities by Vehicular Services along Routes over Streets, and by Ferry Services on Ferry-Service Routes, in the Metropolitan Area of Perth, and for Incidental and Other Purposes.
	No. X of 1957	
Appropriation Act 1957-58	No. 81 of 1957	16 December 1957
An Act to appropriate and apply out of the Consolidated Revenue Fund and from Moneys to Credit of the General Loan Fund and from the Public Account certain sums to make good the supplies granted for the service of the Year ending the thirtieth day of June, One thousand nine hundred and fifty-eight, and to supplement grants made by the present Parliament during its first Session in adjustment of the Vote "Advance to Treasurer, 1956-57," for charges during the Year ended the 30th day of June, 1957; and to approve of certain expenditure under section forty-one of the Forests Act, 1918-1954. (Note: Forests Act 1918 (No. 8 of 1919))

== Sources ==
- "legislation.wa.gov.au".
