= CSG =

CSG may refer to:

== Companies ==
- CSG International, an American company providing business support systems and services
- CSG Limited an Australian ICT company
- Commodore Semiconductor Group, formerly MOS Technology
- China Shipping Group, Chinese shipping conglomerate
- Cloud Software Group, American software conglomerate
- Czechoslovak Group, a Czech holding company in aviation, railway, defense industry.

== Military ==
- California State Guard, the state defense force of California
- Carrier strike group, an operational formation of the US Navy
- Conseil supérieur de la guerre, French military organization
- Corps Support Group, a brigade-sized unit in the United States Army

== Organizations ==
- Camden School for Girls, in London, England
- Columbus School for Girls, in Ohio, United States
- Canadian Senators Group, a parliamentary group
- Centrum Schwule Geschichte (Gay History Center), Cologne, Germany
- Citizens for Self-Governance, a US political organization
- Common Sense Group, a UK political organisation
- Community Security Group, private police force in Australia
- The Council of State Governments, a United States non-profit organization

== Science and technology ==
- Coal seam gas, from coal beds
- Constructive solid geometry, a technique used in solid modeling
- Constructible strategy game, type of tabletop strategy game
- Context-sensitive grammar, a formal grammar
- Crystalline silicon on glass, see Polycrystalline silicon photovoltaics#Novel ideas for polycrystalline silicon
- Haeco-CSG, an obsolete audio signal processing technology

== Other uses ==
- csg, the ISO 639 code for the Chilean Sign Language
- Centre Spatial Guyanais (Guiana Space Centre), near Kourou, a rocket launch site in South America
- Columbus Airport (Georgia), US, IATA code
- Commonwealth Secretary-General
- Contribution sociale généralisée, a tax in France
