= List of acts of the Parliament of Victoria from 1992 =

This is a list of acts of the Parliament of Victoria, Australia for the year 1992.

== 1992 ==
Short title, or popular name	Citation	Royal assent
Long title
Constitution (Governor's Salary) Act 1992 (repealed)	No. 5 of 1992	5 May 1992
An Act to amend the Constitution Act 1975 (Note: Constitution Act 1975 (No. 8750)) in relation to the salary of the Governor and for other purposes. (Repealed by Statute Law Revision (Repeals) Act 1999 (No. 3 of 1999))
Monash University (Pharmacy College) Act 1992	No. 10 of 1992	12 May 1992
An Act to provide for the merger of the Victorian College of Pharmacy with Monash University and for other purposes.
Collingwood Land (Victoria Park) Act 1992	No. 14 of 1992	2 June 1992
An Act to implement arrangements between the Council of the City of Collingwood and the Collingwood Football Club Limited concerning land at Victoria Park and for other purposes.
Melbourne Market and Park Lands Act 1992	No. 20 of 1992	16 June 1992
An Act to revoke the reservations of certain land at Melbourne, to authorise the sale of that land to the Royal Australasian College of Surgeons, (Note: Royal Australasian College of Surgeons.) to amend the Melbourne Market and Park Lands Act 1933 (Note: Melbourne Market and Park Lands Act 1933 (No. 4184)) and for other purposes.
Royal Melbourne Hospital (Redevelopment) Act 1992	No. 23 of 1992	16 June 1992
An Act to facilitate the redevelopment of the Royal Melbourne Hospital and for other purposes.
Supply (1992-93, No. 1) Act 1992 (repealed)	No. 30 of 1992	16 June 1992
An Act to make interim provision for the appropriation of moneys out of the Consolidated Fund for recurrent services and for certain works and purposes for the financial year 1992-93. (Repealed by Statute Law Revision (Repeals) Act 1999 (No. 3 of 1999))
Works and Services (Ancillary Provisions, 1992-93, No. 1) Act 1992 (repealed)	No. 31 of 1992	16 June 1992
An Act for an Act to make ancillary provisions for certain works and purposes for the financial year 1992-93. (Repealed by Statute Law Revision (Repeals) Act 1999 (No. 3 of 1999))
Appropriation (July to October) Act 1992 (repealed)	No. 32 of 1992	16 June 1992
An Act to make provision for the appropriation of moneys out of the Consolidated Fund for certain recurrent services and works and purposes for the period July to October 1992. (Repealed by Statute Law Revision (Repeals) Act 1999 (No. 3 of 1999))
Banking (Premium Accounts) Act 1992	No. 33 of 1992	16 June 1992
An Act to amend the Lotteries Gaming and Betting Act 1966 (Note: Lotteries Gaming and Betting Act 1966 (No. 7429)) and for other purposes.
Loy Yang B Act 1992	No. 35 of 1992	16 June 1992
An Act relating to the Loy Yang B power station, to amend the State Electricity Commission Act 1958 (Note: State Electricity Commission Act 1958 (No. 6377)) and for other purposes.
Heritage Rivers Act 1992	No. 36 of 1992	16 June 1992
An Act to make provision for the protection of particular parts of rivers and river catchment areas which have significant nature conservation, recreation, scenic or cultural heritage attributes to amend the Conservation, Forests and Lands Act 1987, (Note: Conservation, Forests and Lands Act 1987 (No. 41 of 1987)) the Land Conservation Act 1970 (Note: Land Conservation Act 1970 (No. 8008)) and the Water Act 1989 (Note: Water Act 1989 (No. 80 of 1989)) and for other purposes.
Bank Integration Act 1992	No. 42 of 1992	23 June 1992
An Act to facilitate the integration of certain banks and for other purposes.
Swinburne University of Technology Act 1992	No. 44 of 1992	23 June 1992
An Act for an Act to establish a university to be known as Swinburne University of Technology, to amend the Post-Secondary Education Act 1978, (Note: Post-Secondary Education Act 1978 (No. 9145)) the Vocational Education and Training Act 1990, (Note: Vocational Education and Training Act 1990 (No. 45 of 1990)) the Administrative Law Act 1978 (Note: Administrative Law Act 1978 (No. 9234)) and for other purposes.
Royal Melbourne Institute of Technology Act 1992	No. 45 of 1992	23 June 1992
An Act for an Act to establish a university to be known as Royal Melbourne Institute of Technology, to amend the Post-Secondary Education Act 1978, the Vocational Education and Training Act 1990, the Administrative Law Act 1978 and for other purposes.
Financial Institutions (Victoria) Act 1992	No. 48 of 1992	30 June 1992
An Act to make provision for a uniform legislative scheme for certain financial institutions, to establish the Victorian Financial Institutions Commission, to amend the Building Societies Act 1986, (Note: Building Societies Act 1986 (No. 8 of 1986)) the Co-operation Act 1981, (Note: Co-operation Act 1981 (No. 8718)) the Co-operative Housing Societies Act 1958, (Note: Co-operative Housing Societies Act 1958 (No. 6226)) the Friendly Societies Act 1986, (Note: Friendly Societies Act 1986 (No. 119 of 1986)) the Industrial and Provident Societies Act 1958 (Note: Industrial and Provident Societies Act 1958 (No. 6277)) and certain other Acts and for other purposes.
Melbourne University (VCAH) Act 1992	No. 52 of 1992	30 June 1992
An Act to provide for the merger of the Victorian College of Agriculture and Horticulture with Victorian College of Agriculture and Horticulture Limited and for the affiliation of the Company with the University of Melbourne and for other purposes.
Melbourne Water Corporation Act 1992	No. 54 of 1992	30 June 1992
An Act relating to the Melbourne Water Corporation, to amend the Melbourne and Metropolitan Board of Works Act 1958 (Note: Melbourne and Metropolitan Board of Works Act 1958 (No. 6310)) and for other purposes.
Appropriation (Interim Provision, Parliament 1992-93) Act 1992 (repealed)	No. 57 of 1992	30 October 1992
An Act to appropriate certain sums out of the Consolidated Fund for recurrent services and for certain works and purposes in relation to the Parliament for the financial year 1992-93 and to appropriate certain supplies granted under the Supply (1992-93, No. 1) Act 1992 and for other purposes. (Repealed by Statute Law Revision (Repeals) Act 1999 (No. 3 of 1999))
Appropriation (Interim Provision 1992-93) Act 1992 (repealed)	No. 58 of 1992	30 October 1992
(Repealed by Statute Law Revision (Repeals) Act 1999 (No. 3 of 1999))
Constitution (Ministers) Act 1992 (repealed)	No. 59 of 1992	9 November 1992
An Act to amend section 50 of the Constitution Act 1975 and for other purposes. (Repealed by Statute Law Revision (Repeals) Act 1999 (No. 3 of 1999))
Annual Leave Payments Act 1992	No. 60 of 1992	17 November 1992
An Act to make fresh provision for payments to be made to employees covered by State Awards when proceeding on annual leave.
Capital City (Shop Trading) Act 1992 (repealed)	No. 66 of 1992	17 November 1992
An Act to make further provision for the deregulation of shop trading hours in part of the City of Melbourne and in the area surrounding Southbank and to amend the Shop Trading Act 1987 (Note: Shop Trading Act 1987 (No. 10 of 1987)) and for other purposes. (Repealed by Shop Trading Reform Act 1996 (No. 38 of 1996))
Accident Compensation (WorkCover) Act 1992	No. 67 of 1992	19 November 1992
An Act to amend the Accident Compensation Act 1985, (Note: Accident Compensation Act 1985 (No. 10191)) the Workers Compensation Act 1958, (Note: Workers Compensation Act 1958 (No. 6419)) the Occupational Health and Safety Act 1985 (Note: Occupational Health and Safety Act 1985 (No. 10190)) and the Transport Accident Act 1986 (Note: Transport Accident Act 1986 (No. 111 of 1986)) and for other purposes.
Public Sector Management Act 1992 (repealed)	No. 68 of 1992	19 November 1992
An Act to reform the management of the Victorian public sector, to repeal the Public Service Act 1974, (Note: Public Service Act 1974 (No. 8658)) to amend the Employee Relations Act 1992, (Note: Employee Relations Act 1992 (No. 83 of 1992)) the Administrative Arrangements Act 1983, (Note: Administrative Arrangements Act 1983 (No. 9916)) the Bank Holidays Act 1958 (Note: Bank Holidays Act 1958 (No. 6205)) and certain other Acts and for other purposes. (Repealed by Public Sector Reform (Miscellaneous Amendments) Act 1998 (No. 46 of 1998))
Constitution (Governor's Powers) Act 1992	No. 70 of 1992	24 November 1992
An Act to amend section 12A of the Constitution Act 1975 and for other purposes.
Land Tax (Revision) (Amendment) Act 1992 (repealed)	No. 71 of 1992	24 November 1992
An Act to amend the Land Tax (Revision) Act 1991 (Note: Land Tax (Revision) Act 1991 (No. 74 of 1991)) and for other purposes. (Repealed by Statute Law Revision (Repeals) Act 1999 (No. 3 of 1999))
Police Regulation (Amendment) Act 1992 (repealed)	No. 72 of 1992	24 November 1992
An Act to amend the Police Regulation Act 1958 (Note: Police Regulation Act 1958 (No. 6338)) and for other purposes. (Repealed by Legislation Reform (Repeals No. 2) Act 2008 (No. 16 of 2008))
Public Authorities (Dividends) (Amendment) Act 1992 (repealed)	No. 73 of 1992	24 November 1992
An Act to amend the Public Authorities (Dividends) Act 1983 (Note: Public Authorities (Dividends) Act 1983 (No. 10003)) and for other purposes. (Repealed by Statute Law Revision (Repeals) Act 1999 (No. 3 of 1999))
Public Sector (Union Fees) Act 1992	No. 74 of 1992	24 November 1992
An Act to provide for the payment of union fees by public sector employers on behalf of public sector employees.
State Deficit Levy Act 1992	No. 75 of 1992	24 November 1992
An Act to provide the imposition and collection of a State Deficit Levy and for other purposes.
Sunshine Land Act 1992	No. 77 of 1992	24 November 1992
An Act to revoke the permanent reservations of land at Sunshine and for other purposes.
Tattersall Consultations (Amendment) Act 1992 (repealed)	No. 78 of 1992	24 November 1992
An Act to amend the Tattersall Consultations Act 1958 (Note: Tattersall Consultations Act 1958 (No. 6390)) and for other purposes. (Repealed by Statute Law Revision (Repeals) Act 1999 (No. 3 of 1999))
Transport Accident (Amendment) Act 1992 (repealed)	No. 79 of 1992	24 November 1992
An Act to amend the Transport Act 1983 (Note: Transport Act 1983 (No. 9921)) and for other purposes. (Repealed by Statute Law Revision (Repeals) Act 1999 (No. 3 of 1999))
Treasury Corporation of Victoria Act 1992	No. 80 of 1992	24 November 1992
An Act to establish the Treasury Corporation of Victoria, to repeal the Victorian Public Authorities Finance Act 1984, (Note: Victorian Public Authorities Finance Act 1984 (No. 10068)) to make consequential amendments to certain Acts and for other purposes.
Vital State Industries (Works and Services) Act 1992	No. 82 of 1992	24 November 1992
An Act to enable the declaration of vital State services and works and to enable the recovery of an amount for loss or damage suffered as the result of a strike or similar interruption or disruption.
Employee Relations Act 1992 or the Long Service Leave Act 1992	No. 83 of 1992	24 November 1992
An Act to make fresh provision with respect to the law relating to employee relations in Victoria, to repeal the Industrial Relations Act 1979 (Note: Industrial Relations Act 1979 (No. 9365)) and the Hospitals Remuneration Tribunal Act 1978, (Note: Hospitals Remuneration Tribunal Act 1978 (No. 9163)) to amend the Trade Unions Act 1958, (Note: Trade Unions Act 1958 (No. 6397)) the House Contracts Guarantee Act 1987 (Note: House Contracts Guarantee Act 1987 (No. 44 of 1987)) and the Magistrates' Court Act 1989 (Note: Magistrates' Court Act 1989 (No. 51 of 1989)) and for other purposes.
Victoria Park Land Act 1992	No. 86 of 1992	24 November 1992
An Act to implement arrangements between the Council of the City of Collingwood and the Collingwood Football Club Limited concerning land at Victoria Park and to repeal the Collingwood Land (Victoria Park) Act 1992 (Note: Collingwood Land (Victoria Park) Act 1992 (No. 14 of 1992)) and for other purposes.
Dairy Industry Act 1992	No. 88 of 1992	26 November 1992
An Act to re-enact with amendments the Dairy Industry Act 1984, (Note: Dairy Industry Act 1984 (No. 10171)) to repeal the Dairy Industry Act 1984, to amend the Borrowing and Investment Powers Act 1987, (Note: Borrowing and Investment Powers Act 1987 (No. 13 of 1987)) the Food Act 1984 (Note: Food Act 1984 (No. 10082)) and the Stock Diseases Act 1968 (Note: Stock Diseases Act 1968 (No. 7724)) and for other purposes.
State Board of Education (Repeal) Act 1992	No. 89 of 1992	26 November 1992
An Act to repeal the State Board of Education Act 1983 (Note: State Board of Education Act 1983 (No. 9929)) and for other purposes.
State Owned Enterprises Act 1992	No. 90 of 1992	26 November 1992
An Act to provide for the establishment and operation of State owned enterprises and for other purposes.
Aboriginal Land (Manatunga Land) Act 1992 (repealed)	No. 29 of 1992	
(Repealed by Statute Law Repeals Act 2012 (No. 30 of 2012))
Accident Compensation (Further Amendment) Act 1992	No. X of 1992	
Agricultural and Veterinary Chemicals Act 1992	No. X of 1992	
Agricultural Industry Development (Tomato Processing) Act 1992	No. X of 1992	
Alpine Resorts (Amendment) Act 1992 (repealed)	No. 24 of 1992	
(Repealed by Legislation Reform (Repeals No. 2) Act 2008 (No. 16 of 2008))
Borrowing and Investment Powers (Melbourne Water Corporation) Act 1992 (repealed)	No. 61 of 1992	
(Repealed by Statute Law Revision (Repeals) Act 1999 (No. 3 of 1999))
Building Control (Further Amendment) Act 1992 (repealed)	No. 18 of 1992	
(Repealed by Statute Law Revision (Repeals) Act 1999 (No. 3 of 1999))
Children and Young Persons (Amendment) Act 1992	No. X of 1992	
Chiropractors and Osteopaths (Amendment) Act 1992 (repealed)	No. 1 of 1992	
(Repealed by Statute Law Revision (Repeals) Act 1999 (No. 3 of 1999))
Classification of Films and Publications (Amendment) Act 1992 (repealed)	No. 27 of 1992	
(Repealed by Statute Law Revision (Repeals) Act 1999 (No. 3 of 1999))
Crimes (Culpable Driving) Act 1992 (repealed)	No. 13 of 1992	
(Repealed by Statute Law Revision (Repeals) Act 1999 (No. 3 of 1999))
Crimes (Family Violence) (Further Amendment) Act 1992 (repealed)	No. 34 of 1992	
(Repealed by Statute Law Revision (Repeals) Act 1999 (No. 3 of 1999))
Education (Further Amendment) Act 1992 (repealed)	No. 16 of 1992	
(Repealed by Statute Law Revision (Repeals) Act 1999 (No. 3 of 1999))
Egg Industry (Amendment) Act 1992 (repealed)	No. 19 of 1992	
(Repealed by Statute Law Revision (Repeals) Act 1999 (No. 3 of 1999))
Environment Protection (Resource Recovery) Act 1992 (repealed)	No. 53 of 1992	
(Repealed by Legislation Reform (Repeals No. 2) Act 2008 (No. 16 of 2008))
Fire and Emergency Services (Miscellaneous Amendments) Act 1992 (repealed)	No. 39 of 1992	
(Repealed by Statute Law Revision (Repeals) Act 1999 (No. 3 of 1999))
Fisheries (Further Amendment) Act 1992 (repealed)	No. 6 of 1992	
(Repealed by Statute Law Revision (Repeals) Act 1999 (No. 3 of 1999))
Grain Elevators (Amendment) Act 1992 (repealed)	No. 9 of 1992	
(Repealed by Statute Law Revision (Repeals) Act 1999 (No. 3 of 1999))
Hospitals and Charities (Extension) Act 1992 (repealed)	No. 2 of 1992	
(Repealed by Statute Law Revision (Repeals) Act 1999 (No. 3 of 1999))
Industrial Relations (Enterprise Bargaining) Act 1992 (repealed)	No. 47 of 1992	
(Repealed by Statute Law Revision (Repeals) Act 1999 (No. 3 of 1999))
Intellectually Disabled Persons' Services (Trust Money) Act 1992	No. X of 1992	
Juries (Amendment) Act 1992 (repealed)	No. 28 of 1992	
(Repealed by Statute Law Revision (Repeals) Act 1999 (No. 3 of 1999))
Law Reform Commission (Repeal) Act 1992	No. X of 1992	
Legal Aid Commission (Amendment) Act 1992	No. X of 1992	
Libraries (Amendment) Act 1992 (repealed)	No. 7 of 1992	
(Repealed by Statute Law Revision (Repeals) Act 1999 (No. 3 of 1999))
Liquor Control (Clubs) Act 1992	No. X of 1992	
Local Government (Elections) Act 1992 (repealed)	No. 15 of 1992	
(Repealed by Statute Law Revision (Repeals) Act 1999 (No. 3 of 1999))
Local Government (Financial) Act 1992 (repealed)	No. 22 of 1992	
(Repealed by Statute Law Revision (Repeals) Act 1999 (No. 3 of 1999))
Medical Treatment (Agents) Act 1992 (repealed)	No. 26 of 1992	
(Repealed by Statute Law Revision (Repeals) Act 1999 (No. 3 of 1999))
Melbourne Lands and Market Sites (Amendment) Act 1992 (repealed)	No. 21 of 1992	
(Repealed by Statute Law Revision (Repeals) Act 1999 (No. 3 of 1999))
Mildura College Land (Ranfurly) Act 1992	No. X of 1992	
National Parks (Wilderness) Act 1992 (repealed)	No. 40 of 1992	
(Repealed by Legislation Reform (Repeals No. 2) Act 2008 (No. 16 of 2008))
National Tennis Centre (Amendment) Act 1992 (repealed)	No. 8 of 1992	
(Repealed by Statute Law Revision (Repeals) Act 1999 (No. 3 of 1999))
Parliamentary Committees (Amendment) Act 1992 (repealed)	No. 64 of 1992	
(Repealed by Statute Law Revision (Repeals) Act 1999 (No. 3 of 1999))
Parliamentary Salaries and Superannuation (Amendment) Act 1992 (repealed)	No. 56 of 1992	
(Repealed by Statute Law Revision (Repeals) Act 1999 (No. 3 of 1999))
Parliamentary Salaries and Superannuation (Further Amendment) Act 1992 (repealed)	No. 65 of 1992	
(Repealed by Statute Law Revision (Repeals) Act 1999 (No. 3 of 1999))
Partnership (Limited Partnerships) Act 1992 (repealed)	No. 43 of 1992	
(Repealed by Statute Law Revision (Repeals) Act 1999 (No. 3 of 1999))
Police (Industrial Functions) Act 1992 (repealed)	No. 11 of 1992	
(Repealed by Legislation Reform (Repeals No. 2) Act 2008 (No. 16 of 2008))
Port of Melbourne Authority (Amendment) Act 1992	No. 25 of 1992	
(Repealed by Statute Law Revision (Repeals) Act 1999 (No. 3 of 1999))
Racing (Further Miscellaneous Amendments) Act 1992 (repealed)	No. 17 of 1992	
(Repealed by Statute Law Revision (Repeals) Act 1999 (No. 3 of 1999))
Road Safety (Licence Cancellation) Act 1992 (repealed)	No. 41 of 1992	
(Repealed by Statute Law Revision (Repeals) Act 1999 (No. 3 of 1999))
State Electricity Commission (Amendment) Act 1992 (repealed)	No. 3 of 1992	
(Repealed by Statute Law Revision (Repeals) Act 1999 (No. 3 of 1999))
State Taxation (Amendment) Act 1992	No. X of 1992	
Superannuation (Occupational Superannuation Standards) Act 1992	No. X of 1992	
Superannuation (Public Sector) Act 1992	No. X of 1992	
Transport (Amendment) Act 1992	No. X of 1992	
Vermin and Noxious Weeds (Poison Baits) Act 1992	No. X of 1992	
Victorian Tourism Commission (Tourism Victoria) Act 1992 (repealed)	No. 81 of 1992	
(Repealed by Statute Law Revision (Repeals) Act 1999 (No. 3 of 1999))
Water (Elections) Act 1992 (repealed)	No. 12 of 1992	
(Repealed by Statute Law Revision (Repeals) Act 1999 (No. 3 of 1999))
Water (Rural Water Corporation) Act 1992 (repealed)	No. 50 of 1992	
(Repealed by Legislation Reform (Repeals No. 2) Act 2008 (No. 16 of 2008))

== Sources ==
- "1992 Victorian Historical Acts". AustLII.
