= List of acts of the Parliament of Victoria from 1985 =

This is a list of acts of the Parliament of Victoria, Australia for the year 1985.

== 1985 ==
Short title, or popular name	Citation	Royal assent
Long title
Labour and Industry (Anzac Day) Act 1985 (repealed)	No. 10172	24 April 1985
An Act to amend section 82 of the Labour and Industry Act 1958. (Note: Labour and Industry Act 1958 (No. 6283)) (Repealed by Statute Law Revision Act 1995 (No. 11 of 1995))
Fire Authorities (Amendment) Act 1985 (repealed)	No. 10173	30 April 1985
An Act to correct an error relating to the commencement of a provision making consequential and minor amendments to the Fire Authorities Act 1984 (Note: Fire Authorities Act 1984 (No. 10149)) and for other purposes. (Repealed by Statute Law Revision Act 1995 (No. 11 of 1995))
Water and Sewerage Authorities (Financial) Act 1985	No. 10174	30 April 1985
An Act to make provision with respect to the sinking funds of and the accounts kept by certain Water and Sewerage Authorities, to amend the Water Act 1958, (Note: Water Act 1958 (No. 6413)) the Sewerage Districts Act 1958, (Note: Sewerage Districts Act 1958 (No. 6368)) the Geelong Waterworks and Sewerage Act 1958, (Note: Geelong Waterworks and Sewerage Act 1958 (No. 6263)) the Latrobe Valley Act 1958, (Note: Latrobe Valley Act 1958 (No. 6290)) the Mildura Irrigation Trusts and Sunraysia Water Board Act 1958 (Note: Mildura Irrigation and Water Trusts Act 1958 (No. 6316)) and the Water and Sewerage Authorities (Restructuring) Act 1983 (Note: Water and Sewerage Authorities (Restructuring) Act 1983 (No. 9895)) and for other purposes.
Water (Mornington Peninsula and District Water Board) Act 1985	No. 10175	7 May 1985
An Act to provide for the appointment of a Chairperson and Chief Executive Officer of the Mornington Peninsula and District Water Board, for the payment of members of that Board, and for the giving of directions to the Board by the Minister and for other purposes.
Liquor Control (Amendment) Act 1985 (repealed)	No. 10176	14 May 1985
An Act to amend the Liquor Control Act 1968 (Note: Liquor Control Act 1968 (No. 7695)) and the Liquor Control (Amendment) Act 1984, (Note: Liquor Control (Amendment) Act 1984 (No. 10130)) and for other purposes. (Repealed by Statute Law Revision Act 1995 (No. 11 of 1995))
Water (Advances) Act 1985 (repealed)	No. 10177	14 May 1985
An Act to make provision for advances of water rights or advances of rights to divert water and for other purposes. (Repealed by Statute Law Revision (Repeals) Act 1999 (No. 3 of 1999))
Motor Car (Amendment) Act 1985	No. 10178	14 May 1985
An Act to amend the Motor Car Act 1958 (Note: Motor Car Act 1958 (No. 6325)) and for other purposes.
Health (Radiation Safety) Act 1985 (repealed)	No. 10179	4 June 1985
An Act to amend the Health Act 1958 (Note: Health Act 1958 (No. 6270)) and for other purposes. (Repealed by Statute Law Revision Act 1995 (No. 11 of 1995))
South Melbourne Land Act 1985	No. 10180	4 June 1985
An Act to close a portion of a road in South Melbourne and for other purposes.
State Disasters (Amendment) Act 1985 (repealed)	No. 10181	4 June 1985
An Act to amend the State Disasters Act 1983 (Note: State Disasters Act 1983 (No. 10010)) and for other purposes. (Repealed by Statute Law Revision Act 1995 (No. 11 of 1995))
Coal Mines (Pensions Increase) Act 1985	No. 10182	12 June 1985
An Act to amend Part III. of the Coal Mines Act 1958 (Note: Coal Mines Act 1958 (No. 6221)) and for other purposes.
Professional Boxing Control Act 1985 or the Professional Boxing and Martial Arts Act 1985 or the Professional Boxing and Combat Sports Act 1985	No. 10183	12 June 1985
An Act to broaden existing controls on professional boxing and to repeal the Professional Boxing Control Act 1975 (Note: Professional Boxing Control Act 1975 (No. 8697)) and for other purposes.
Racing (Amendment) Act 1985 (repealed)	No. 10184	12 June 1985
An Act to amend the Racing Act 1958 (Note: Racing Act 1958 (No. 6353)) with respect to the powers and functions of the Totalizator Agency Board, to make provision with respect to the distribution of the commission deducted under section 116CD of that Act, to amend the Liquor Control Act 1968 and for other purposes. (Repealed by Statute Law Revision Act 1995 (No. 11 of 1995))
Supply (1985-86, No. 1) Act 1985 (repealed)	No. 10185	12 June 1985
An Act to make interim provision for the appropriation of moneys out of the Consolidated Fund for the recurrent services and for certain works and purposes for the financial year 1985-86. (Repealed by Statute Law Revision Act 1995 (No. 11 of 1995))
Victorian Economic Development Corporation (Amendment) Act 1985	No. 10186	12 June 1985
An Act to amend the Victorian Economic Development Corporation Act 1981 (Note: Victorian Economic Development Corporation Act 1981 (No. 9574)) and the Victorian Economic Development Corporation (Amendment) Act 1982 (Note: Victorian Economic Development Corporation (Amendment) Act 1982 (No. 9745)) and for other purposes.
Town and Country Planning (Transfer of Functions) Act 1985 (repealed)	No. 10187	4 July 1985
An Act to transfer the land use planning functions of the Melbourne and Metropolitan Board of Works to the Minister for Planning and Environment, to amend the Town and Country Planning Act 1961, (Note: Town and Country Planning Act 1961 (No. 6849)) the Melbourne and Metropolitan Board of Works Act 1958 (Note: Melbourne and Metropolitan Board of Works Act 1958 (No. 6310)) and other Acts and for other purposes. (Repealed by Legislation Reform (Repeals No. 3) Act 2008 (No. 53 of 2008))
BLF (De-recognition) Act 1985	No. 10188	30 July 1985
An Act to make provision with respect to The Australian Building Construction Employees' and Builders Labourers' Federation and the members thereof and for other purposes.
Dangerous Goods Act 1985	No. 10189	30 July 1985
An Act to promote the safety of persons and property in relation to the manufacture, storage, transfer, transport, sale, purchase and use of dangerous goods and the import of explosives, to consolidate and amend the law relating to explosives and other dangerous goods, to repeal the Liquid Fuel Act 1941, (Note: Liquid Fuel Act 1941 (No. 4871)) the Liquified Petroleum Gas Act 1958, (Note: Liquified Petroleum Gas Act 1958 (No. 6296)) the Explosives Act 1960, (Note: Explosives Act 1960 (No. 6715)) the Inflammable Liquids Act 1966, (Note: Inflammable Liquids Act 1966 (No. 7512)) the Liquefied Gases Act 1968 (Note: Liquefied Gases Act 1968 (No. 7754)) and the Dangerous Goods (Road Transport) Act 1984, (Note: Dangerous Goods (Road Transport) Act 1984 (No. 10159)) to amend the Health Act 1958, the Mines Act 1958, (Note: Mines Act 1958 (No. 6320)) the Transport Act 1983 (Note: Transport Act 1983 (No. 9921)) and for other purposes.
Occupational Health and Safety Act 1985	No. 10190	30 July 1985
An Act to promote and improve standards for occupational health, safety and welfare, to establish the Occupational Health and Safety Commission, to repeal the Industrial Safety, Health and Welfare Act 1981 (Note: Industrial Safety, Health and Welfare Act 1981 (No. 9717)) and certain other Acts, to amend certain other Acts, and for other purposes.
Accident Compensation Act 1985	No. 10191	30 July 1985
An Act to establish the Accident Compensation Commission, to constitute an Accident Compensation Tribunal, to establish the Victorian Accident Rehabilitation Council, to provide for the payment of compensation, to impose a levy in respect of accident compensation, to provide for the assessment and collection of the levy, to amend the Workers Compensation Act 1958, (Note: Workers Compensation Act 1958 (No. 6419)) the Pay-roll Tax Act 1971, (Note: Pay-roll Tax Act 1971 (No. 8154)) the Motor Accidents Act 1973, (Note: Motor Accidents Act 1973 (No. 8429)) the Motor Car Act 1958 and certain other Acts and for other purposes.
Health (Blood Donations) Act 1985 (repealed)	No. 10192	24 September 1985
An Act to limit liability in respect of the transmission of acquired immune deficiency syndrome through the transfusion of blood, to amend the Health Act 1958 and for other purposes. (Repealed by Statute Law Revision Act 1995 (No. 11 of 1995))
Racing (Fixed Percentage Distribution) Act 1985 (repealed)	No. 10193	1 October 1985
An Act to amend the Racing Act 1958 with respect to the distribution of the residue of commission by the Totalizator Agency Board, to repeal section 16 of the Racing (Amendment) Act 1983 (Note: Racing (Amendment) Act 1983 (No. 9924)) and the Racing (Amendment) Act 1984 (Note: Racing (Amendment) Act 1984 (No. 10133)) and for other purposes. (Repealed by Statute Law Revision Act 1995 (No. 11 of 1995))
Anglican Church of Australia Act 1985	No. 10194	8 October 1985
An Act to amend the Church of England Act 1854 (Note: Church of England Act 1854 (18 Vict. No. 45)) and the Act No. 797 (Note: 48 Vict. No. 797) of the Parliament of Victoria and for other purposes.
Lotteries Gaming and Betting (Gaming Machines) Act 1985 (repealed)	No. 10195	8 October 1985
An Act to amend Part V. of the Lotteries Gaming and Betting Act 1966 (Note: Lotteries Gaming and Betting Act 1966 (No. 7429)) and for other purposes. (Repealed by Statute Law Revision Act 1995 (No. 11 of 1995))
Metropolitan Fire Brigades Superannuation (Amendment) Act 1985 (repealed)	No. 10196	8 October 1985
An Act to amend the Metropolitan Fire Brigades Superannuation Act 1976 (Note: Metropolitan Fire Brigades Superannuation Act 1976 (No. 8952)) and for other purposes. (Repealed by Statute Law Revision Act 1995 (No. 11 of 1995))
Westernport (Oil Refinery) (Further Agreement) Act 1985	No. 10197	8 October 1985
An Act to ratify, validate, approve and otherwise give effect to an Agreement between the Premier for and on behalf of the State of Victoria and BP Australia Limited relating to the refinery at Crib Point and for other purposes.
Fairfield Land Act 1985	No. 10198	22 October 1985
An Act to revoke the permanent reservation of certain land and for connected purposes.
Bank Holidays (Amendment) Act 1985 (repealed)	No. 10199	22 October 1985
An Act to repeal section 7A of the Bank Holidays Act 1958 (Note: Bank Holidays Act 1958 (No. 6205)) and for other purposes. (Repealed by Statute Law Revision Act 1995 (No. 11 of 1995))
Industrial Relations (Complementary Industrial Relations System) Act 1985 (repealed)	No. 10200	29 October 1985
An Act to amend the Industrial Relations Act 1979, (Note: Industrial Relations Act 1979 (No. 9365)) and for other purposes. (Repealed by Statute Law Revision Act 1995 (No. 11 of 1995))
Fair Trading Act 1985 (repealed)	No. 10201	29 October 1985
An Act to make provision with respect to certain unfair or undesirable trade practices, to amend the Consumer Affairs Act 1972 (Note: Consumer Protection Act 1972 (No. 8276)) and the Ministry of Consumer Affairs Act 1973 (Note: Ministry of Consumer Affairs Act 1973 (No. 8442)) and for other purposes. (Repealed by Fair Trading Act 1999 (No. 16 of 1999))
Motor Car (Further Amendment) Act 1985 (repealed)	No. 10202	6 November 1985
An Act to amend the Motor Car Act 1958 with respect to speed trials, breath analysis, registration fees and fines, and for other purposes. (Repealed by Statute Law Revision Act 1995 (No. 11 of 1995))
Australia Acts (Request) Act 1985	No. 10203	6 November 1985
An Act to enable the constitutional arrangements affecting the Commonwealth and the States to be brought into conformity with the status of the Commonwealth of Australia as a sovereign, independent and federal nation.
Urban Land Authority (Amendment) Act 1985 (repealed)	No. 10204	6 November 1985
An Act to amend the Urban Land Authority Act 1979 (Note: Urban Land Authority Act 1979 (No. 9320)) and for other purposes. (Repealed by Statute Law Revision Act 1995 (No. 11 of 1995))
Local Government (Rating Appeals) Act 1985	No. 10205	6 November 1985
An Act to amend Part IX. of the Local Government Act 1958 (Note: Local Government Act 1958 (No. 6299)) in relation to rating appeals and for other purposes.
National Tennis Centre Act 1985 or the Melbourne and Olympic Parks Act 1985	No. 10206	6 November 1985
An Act to establish a National Tennis Centre Trust to administer a national tennis centre and for other purposes.
Appropriation (1985-86, No. 1) Act 1985 (repealed)	No. 10207	26 November 1985
(Repealed by Statute Law Revision Act 1995 (No. 11 of 1995))
Historic Buildings (Amendment) Act 1985	No. 10208	26 November 1985
An Act to amend the Historic Buildings Act 1981 (Note: Historic Buildings Act 1981 (No. 9667)) and for other purposes.
Labour and Industry (Registration Fees) Act 1985 (repealed)	No. 10209	26 November 1985
An Act to amend the Labour and Industry Act 1958 with respect to registration fees and for other purposes. (Repealed by Statute Law Revision Act 1995 (No. 11 of 1995))
Land Tax (Amendment) Act 1985	No. 10210	26 November 1985
An Act to amend the Land Tax Act 1958 (Note: Land Tax Act 1958 (No. 6289)) and for other purposes.
Liquor Control (Vigneron's Licences) Act 1985 (repealed)	No. 10211	26 November 1985
An Act to amend section 156 of the Liquor Control Act 1968 and for other purposes. (Repealed by Statute Law Revision Act 1995 (No. 11 of 1995))
Pay-roll Tax (Amendment) Act 1985 (repealed)	No. 10212	26 November 1985
An Act to amend the Pay-roll Tax Act 1971 and for other purposes. (Repealed by Payroll Tax Act 2007 (No. 26 of 2007))
State Electricity Commission (Amendment) Act 1985 (repealed)	No. 10213	26 November 1985
An Act to make further provision for borrowings by the State Electricity Commission and for other purposes. (Repealed by Statute Law Revision Act 1995 (No. 11 of 1995))
Interpretation of Legislation (Further Amendment) Act 1985 (repealed)	No. 10214	3 December 1985
An Act to amend the Interpretation of Legislation Act 1984 (Note: Interpretation of Legislation Act 1984 (No. 10096)) and for other purposes. (Repealed by Statute Law Revision Act 1995 (No. 11 of 1995))
South Yarra Project (Subdivision and Management) Act 1985	No. 10215	3 December 1985
An Act to make provision for the subdivision and management of land at South Yarra, to amend the South Yarra Project Act 1984 (Note: South Yarra Project Act 1984 (No. 10153)) and for other purposes.
Sale of Land (Allotments) Act 1985 (repealed)	No. 10216	3 December 1985
An Act to amend the Sale of Land Act 1962 with respect to the preselling of allotments of land and to amend the Strata Titles Act 1967, (Note: Strata Titles Act 1967 (No. 7551)) the Transfer of Land Act 1958, (Note: Transfer of Land Act 1958 (No. 6399)) the Local Government Act 1958 and the Building Control Act 1981 (Note: Building Control Act 1981 (No. 9720)) and for other purposes. (Repealed by Statute Law Revision Act 1995 (No. 11 of 1995))
Construction Industry Long Service Leave (Amendment) Act 1985	No. 10217	3 December 1985
An Act to amend the Construction Industry Long Service Act 1983 (Note: Construction Industry Long Service Act 1983 (No. 9935)) and for other purposes.
Groundwater (Border Agreement) Act 1985	No. 10218	3 December 1985
An Act to approve and provide for carrying out an Agreement for the management of groundwater adjacent to the border of South Australia and Victoria, to amend the Groundwater Act 1969, (Note: Groundwater Act 1969 (No. 7849)) to repeal the Groundwater (Reserves) Act 1984 (Note: Groundwater (Reserves) Act 1984 (No. 10066)) and for other purposes.
Water Acts (Amendment) Act 1985	No. 10219	3 December 1985
An Act to amend the Water Act 1958, the River Improvement Act 1958, (Note: River Improvement Act 1958 (No. 6358)) the Dandenong Valley Authority Act 1963 (Note: Dandenong Valley Authority Act 1963 (No. 7060)) and the Water and Sewerage Authorities (Restructuring) Act 1983, to make consequential amendments to certain other Acts and for other purposes.
Transport (Amendment) Act 1985 (repealed)	No. 10220	3 December 1985
An Act to amend the Transport Act 1983, to repeal the Serviceton Public Hall Act 1956 (Note: Serviceton Public Hall Act 1956 (No. 5942)) and for other purposes. (Repealed by Statute Law Revision Act 1995 (No. 11 of 1995))
Dental Technicians (Licences) Act 1985 (repealed)	No. 10221	3 December 1985
An Act to amend the Dental Technicians Act 1972 (Note: Dental Technicians Act 1972 (No. 8366)) and for other purposes. (Repealed by Statute Law Revision Act 1995 (No. 11 of 1995))
Director of Public Prosecutions (Amendment) Act 1985 (repealed)	No. 10222	3 December 1985
An Act to amend the Director of Public Prosecutions Act 1982 (Note: Director of Public Prosecutions Act 1982 (No. 9848)) to enable certain functions and powers of the Director of Public Prosecutions to be referred to the Attorney-General and for other purposes. (Repealed by Statute Law Revision Act 1995 (No. 11 of 1995))
Decentralized Industry Incentive Payments (Amendment) Act 1985 (repealed)	No. 10223	3 December 1985
An Act to amend the Decentralized Industry Incentive Payments Act 1972, (Note: Decentralized Industry Incentive Payments Act 1972 (No. 8383)) the Economic Development Act 1981 (Note: Economic Development Act 1981 (No. 9567)) and the Victorian Economic Development Corporation Act 1981 and for other purposes. (Repealed by Statute Law Revision Act 1995 (No. 11 of 1995))
Land (Miscellaneous Matters) Act 1985	No. 10224	3 December 1985
An Act to close a portion of a road in Geelong, to repeal Act 21 Victoria No. 11 (Note: 21 Vict. No. 11) and the Newmarket Sheep Sales Act 1974, (Note: Newmarket Sheep Sales Act 1974 (No. 8580)) to amend the Local Government Act 1890 (Note: Local Government Act 1890 (54 Vict. No. 1112)) and the Local Government Act 1958, to revoke the permanent reservation of certain lands and for other purposes.
Uniting Church in Australia (Trust Property) Act 1985	No. 10225	3 December 1985
An Act to amend the Uniting Church in Australia Act 1977 (Note: Uniting Church in Australia Act 1977 (No. 9021)) and for other purposes.
Hairdressers Registration (Repeal) Act 1985 (repealed)	No. 10226	10 December 1985
An Act to repeal the Hairdressers Registration Act 1958 (Note: Hairdressers Registration Act 1958 (No. 6267)) and for other purposes. (Repealed by Legislation Reform (Repeals No. 1) Act 2008 (No. 10 of 2008))
Wrongs (Contribution) Act 1985 (repealed)	No. 10227	10 December 1985
An Act to amend Part IV. of the Wrongs Act 1958 (Note: Wrongs Act 1958 (No. 6420)) to make new provision for contribution between persons who are liable for the same damage and to amend the law relating to proceedings against persons liable for the same debt or damage and for other purposes. (Repealed by Statute Law Revision Act 1995 (No. 11 of 1995))
National Mutual Permanent Building Society Act 1985	No. 10228	10 December 1985
An Act to enable the National Mutual Permanent Building Society to become a public company deemed to be incorporated in Victoria and for other purposes.
Vermin and Noxious Weeds (Amendment) Act 1985	No. 10229	10 December 1985
An Act to amend the Vermin and Noxious Weeds Act 1958 (Note: Vermin and Noxious Weeds Act 1958 (No. 6409)) and for other purposes.
Trustee (Secondary Mortgage Market Amendment) Act 1985 (repealed)	No. 10230	10 December 1985
An Act to make amendments to provisions for a secondary mortgage market, to amend the Trustee Act 1958 (Note: Trustee Act 1958 (No. 6401)) and for other purposes. (Repealed by Statute Law Revision Act 1995 (No. 11 of 1995))
Evidence (Amendment) Act 1985 (repealed)	No. 10231	10 December 1985
An Act to amend the Evidence Act 1958. (Note: Evidence Act 1958 (No. 6246)) (Repealed by Statute Law Revision Act 1995 (No. 11 of 1995))
Motor Car (Photographic Detection Devices) Act 1985 (repealed)	No. 10232	10 December 1985
An Act to make provision in the Motor Car Act 1958 for the detection of offences by photographic detection devices and for other purposes. (Repealed by Statute Law Revision Act 1995 (No. 11 of 1995))
Crimes (Amendment) Act 1985 (repealed)	No. 10233	10 December 1985
An Act to amend and codify the law relating to the offence of attempt, to reform the law relating to certain offences against the person and for those and certain other purposes to amend the Crimes Act 1958 (Note: Crimes Act 1958 (No. 6231)) and Part VIII. of the Magistrates' Courts Act 1971 (Note: Magistrates' Courts Act 1971 (No. 8184)) and for other purposes. (Repealed by Statute Law Revision Act 1995 (No. 11 of 1995))
Forests (Wood Pulp Agreement) (Amendment) Act 1985	No. 10234	10 December 1985
An Act to amend the Forests (Wood Pulp Agreements) Act 1974 (Note: Forests (Wood Pulp Agreements) Act 1974 (No. 8563)) to ratify, validate, approve and give effect to an agreement between the Forests Commission and APM Limited to amend the Softwood Timber Agreement made in 1973 and for other purposes.
Forests and Country Fire Authority (Penalties) Act 1985 (repealed)	No. 10235	10 December 1985
An Act to amend the Forests Act 1958 (Note: Forests Act 1958 (No. 6254)) (and various related Acts) and the Country Fire Authority Act 1958 (Note: Country Fire Authority Act 1958 (No. 6228)) with respect to penalties, and for other purposes. (Repealed by Statute Law Revision Act 1995 (No. 11 of 1995))
Associations Incorporation (Miscellaneous Amendments) Act 1985 (repealed)	No. 10236	10 December 1985
An Act to amend the Associations Incorporation Act 1981 (Note: Associations Incorporation Act 1981 (No. 9713)) and for other purposes. (Repealed by Statute Law Revision Act 1995 (No. 11 of 1995))
Town and Country Planning (Planning Schemes) Act 1985	No. 10237	10 December 1985
An Act to make provision with respect to the operation and validity of certain planning schemes.
Melbourne University (Amendment) Act 1985 (repealed)	No. 10238	10 December 1985
An Act to amend generally the Melbourne University Act 1958 (Note: University Act 1958 (No. 6405)) and for other purposes. (Repealed by Statute Law Revision Act 1995 (No. 11 of 1995))
Building Control (Plumbers, Gasfitters and Drainers) Act 1985	No. 10239	10 December 1985
An Act to amend the Building Control Act 1981 in relation to the registration of plumbers, gasfitters, drainers and contractors and for other purposes.
Town and Country Planning (Westernport) Act 1985 (repealed)	No. 10240	10 December 1985
An Act to amend the Town and Country Planning Act 1961. (Repealed by Statute Law Revision Act 1995 (No. 11 of 1995))
Soil Conservation and Land Utilization (Appeals) Act 1985	No. 10241	10 December 1985
An Act to transfer the right of appeal from decisions of the Soil Conservation Authority from the County Court to the Planning Appeals Board, to amend the Soil Conservation and Land Utilization Act 1958 (Note: Soil Conservation and Land Utilization Act 1958 (No. 6372)) and the Planning Appeals Board Act 1980 (Note: Planning Appeals Board Act 1980 (No. 9512)) and for other purposes.
Melbourne Cricket Ground (Amendment) Act 1985	No. 10242	10 December 1985
An Act to amend the Melbourne Cricket Ground Act 1933 (Note: Melbourne Cricket Ground Act 1933 (No. 4149)) and the Melbourne Cricket Ground Act 1984 (Note: Melbourne Cricket Ground Act 1984 (No. 10039)) with respect to the operation of floodlights and administration, and for other purposes.
Marketing of Primary Products and Egg Industry Stabilization (Amendment) Act 1985 (repealed)	No. 10243	10 December 1985
An Act to amend the Marketing of Primary Products Act 1958 (Note: Marketing of Primary Products Act 1958 (No. 6304)) and the Egg Industry Stabilization Act 1983 (Note: Egg Industry Stabilization Act 1983 (No. 10024)) and for other purposes. (Repealed by Statute Law Revision Act 1995 (No. 11 of 1995))
Registration of Births Deaths and Marriages (Amendment) Act 1985 (repealed)	No. 10244	10 December 1985
An Act to amend the Registration of Births Deaths and Marriages Act 1959 (Note: Registration of Births Deaths and Marriages Act 1959 (No. 6564)) and to consequentially amend certain other Acts. (Repealed by Statute Law Revision Act 1995 (No. 11 of 1995))
Juries (Amendment) Act 1985 (repealed)	No. 10245	10 December 1985
An Act to protect the confidentiality of jury deliberations, to amend the Juries Act 1967 (Note: Juries Act 1967 (No. 7651)) and for other purposes. (Repealed by Statute Law Revision Act 1995 (No. 11 of 1995))
Credit (Administration) (Amendment) Act 1985 (repealed)	No. 10246	10 December 1985
An Act to amend the Credit (Administration) Act 1984 (Note: Credit (Administration) Act 1984 (No. 10091)) and for other purposes. (Repealed by Statute Law Revision Act 1995 (No. 11 of 1995))
Equal Opportunity (Amendment) Act 1985 (repealed)	No. 10247	10 December 1985
An Act to amend the Equal Opportunity Act 1984 (Note: Equal Opportunity Act 1984 (No. 10095)) and for other purposes. (Repealed by Statute Law Revision Act 1995 (No. 11 of 1995))
Dairy Industry (Milk Price) Act 1985 (repealed)	No. 10248	10 December 1985
An Act to amend the Dairy Industry Act 1984. (Note: Dairy Industry Act 1984 (No. 10171)) (Repealed by Statute Law Revision Act 1995 (No. 11 of 1995))
Magistrates (Summary Proceedings) (Amendment) Act 1985 (repealed)	No. 10249	10 December 1985
An Act to amend the Magistrates (Summary Proceedings) Act 1975 (Note: Magistrates (Summary Proceedings) Act 1975 (No. 8731)) and other Acts and for other purposes. (Repealed by Statute Law Revision Act 1995 (No. 11 of 1995))
Police Regulation (Amendment) Act 1985	No. 10250	10 December 1985
An Act to amend the Police Regulation Act 1958, (Note: Police Regulation Act 1958 (No. 6338)) the Magistrates' Courts Act 1971 and the Ombudsman Act 1973, (Note: Ombudsman Act 1973 (No. 8414)) and for other purposes.
Nurses (Amendment) Act 1985 (repealed)	No. 10251	10 December 1985
An Act to amend the Nurses Act 1958 and for other purposes. (Repealed by Statute Law Revision Act 1995 (No. 11 of 1995))
Legal Profession Practice (Amendment) Act 1985 (repealed)	No. 10252	10 December 1985
An Act to amend the Legal Profession Practice Act 1958, (Note: Legal Profession Practice Act 1958 (No. 6291)) the Leo Cussen Institute for Continuing Legal Education Act 1972 (Note: Leo Cussen Institute for Continuing Legal Education Act 1972 (No. 8254)) and Part VIII. of the Supreme Court Act 1958 (Note: Supreme Court Act 1958 (No. 6387)) and for other purposes. (Repealed by Statute Law Revision Act 1995 (No. 11 of 1995))
Firearms (Amendment) Act 1985 (repealed)	No. 10253	10 December 1985
An Act to amend the Firearms Act 1958 (Note: Firearms Act 1958 (No. 6251)) and the Firearms (General Amendment) Act 1984 (Note: Firearms (General Amendment) Act 1984 (No. 10124)) and for other purposes. (Repealed by Statute Law Revision Act 1995 (No. 11 of 1995))
Co-operation (Amendment) Act 1985 (repealed)	No. 10254	10 December 1985
An Act to amend the Co-operation Act 1981 (Note: Co-operation Act 1981 (No. 8718)) and the Co-operative Housing Societies Act 1958 (Note: Co-operative Housing Societies Act 1958 (No. 6226)) and for other purposes. (Repealed by Statute Law Revision Act 1995 (No. 11 of 1995))
Employment and Training (Rebates) Act 1985	No. 10255	10 December 1985
An Act to make provision for certain rebates in respect of apprentices, to amend the Employment and Training Act 1981, (Note: Employment and Training Act 1981 (No. 9678)) the Industrial Training Act 1975, (Note: Industrial Training Act 1975 (No. 8706)) the Pay-roll Tax Act 1971 and the Accident Compensation Act 1985 (Note: Accident Compensation Act 1985 (No. 10191)) and for other purposes.
Stamps and Business Franchise (Tobacco) (Amendment) Act 1985	No. 10256	10 December 1985
An Act to amend the Stamps Act 1958 (Note: Stamps Act 1958 (No. 6375)) and the Business Franchise (Tobacco) Act 1974 (Note: Business Franchise (Tobacco) Act 1974 (No. 8597)) and for other purposes.
Coroners Act 1985	No. 10257	10 December 1985
An Act to establish the office of State Coroner, to amend the law relating to coroners, to repeal the Coroners Act 1958 (Note: Coroners Act 1958 (No. 6227)) and for other purposes.
Superannuation Schemes Amendment Act 1985	No. 10258	10 December 1985
An Act to amend the Superannuation Act 1958, (Note: Superannuation Act 1958 (No. 6386)) the State Employees Retirement Benefits Act 1979, (Note: State Employees Retirement Benefits Act 1979 (No. 9363)) the Local Authorities Superannuation Act 1958, (Note: Local Authorities Superannuation Act 1958 (No. 6298)) the Hospitals Superannuation Act 1965 (Note: Hospitals Superannuation Act 1965 (No. 7354)) and the Superannuation Benefits Act 1977, (Note: Superannuation Benefits Act 1977 (No. 9017)) to make consequential amendments to certain other Acts and for other purposes.
Housing (Commonwealth–State–Northern Territory Agreement) Act 1985 (repealed)	No. 10259	10 December 1985
An Act to amend the Housing Act 1983 (Note: Housing Act 1983 (No. 10020)) to ratify the execution for and on behalf of the State of Victoria of an agreement between the Commonwealth, the States and the Northern Territory of Australia relating to housing, to approve that agreement and for other purposes. (Repealed by Statute Law Revision Act 1995 (No. 11 of 1995))
Penalties and Sentences Act 1985	No. 10260	10 December 1985
An Act to revise and restate the sentencing powers of courts, to enable courts to make community-based orders and to suspend sentences of imprisonment, to repeal the Penalties and Sentences Act 1981, (Note: Penalties and Sentences Act 1981 (No. 9554)) to make consequential amendments to various Acts and for other purposes.
Environment Protection (Industrial Waste) Act 1985	No. 10261	10 December 1985
An Act to amend the Environment Protection Act 1970 (Note: Environment Protection Act 1970 (No. 8056)) and the Melbourne and Metropolitan Board of Works Act 1958 and for other purposes.
Health (Amendment) Act 1985	No. 10262	10 December 1985
An Act to repeal the Health Commission Act 1977 (Note: Health Commission Act 1977 (No. 9023)) and to amend the Health Act 1958 and certain other Acts.

== Sources ==
- "1985 Victorian Historical Acts". AustLII.
