= Stipend =

Regular fixed sum of money paid for services or to defray expenses

A stipend is a regular fixed sum of money paid for services or to defray expenses, such as for scholarship, internship, or apprenticeship. It is often distinct from an income or a salary because it does not necessarily represent payment for work performed; instead it represents a payment that enables somebody to be exempt partly or wholly from waged or salaried employment in order to undertake a role that is normally unpaid or voluntary, or which cannot be measured in terms of a task (e.g. members of the clergy). A paid judge in an English or Welsh magistrates' court was formerly termed a "stipendiary magistrate", as distinct from the unpaid "lay magistrates". In 2000, these were respectively renamed "district judge" and "magistrate".

Stipends are usually lower than would be expected as a permanent salary for similar work. This is because the stipend is complemented by other benefits such as accreditation, instruction, food, and/or accommodation.

Some graduate schools make stipend payments to help students have the time and funds to earn their academic degree (i.e. master's and doctoral degrees). Universities usually refer to money paid to graduate students as a stipend, rather than wages, to reflect complementary benefits.

== Background ==
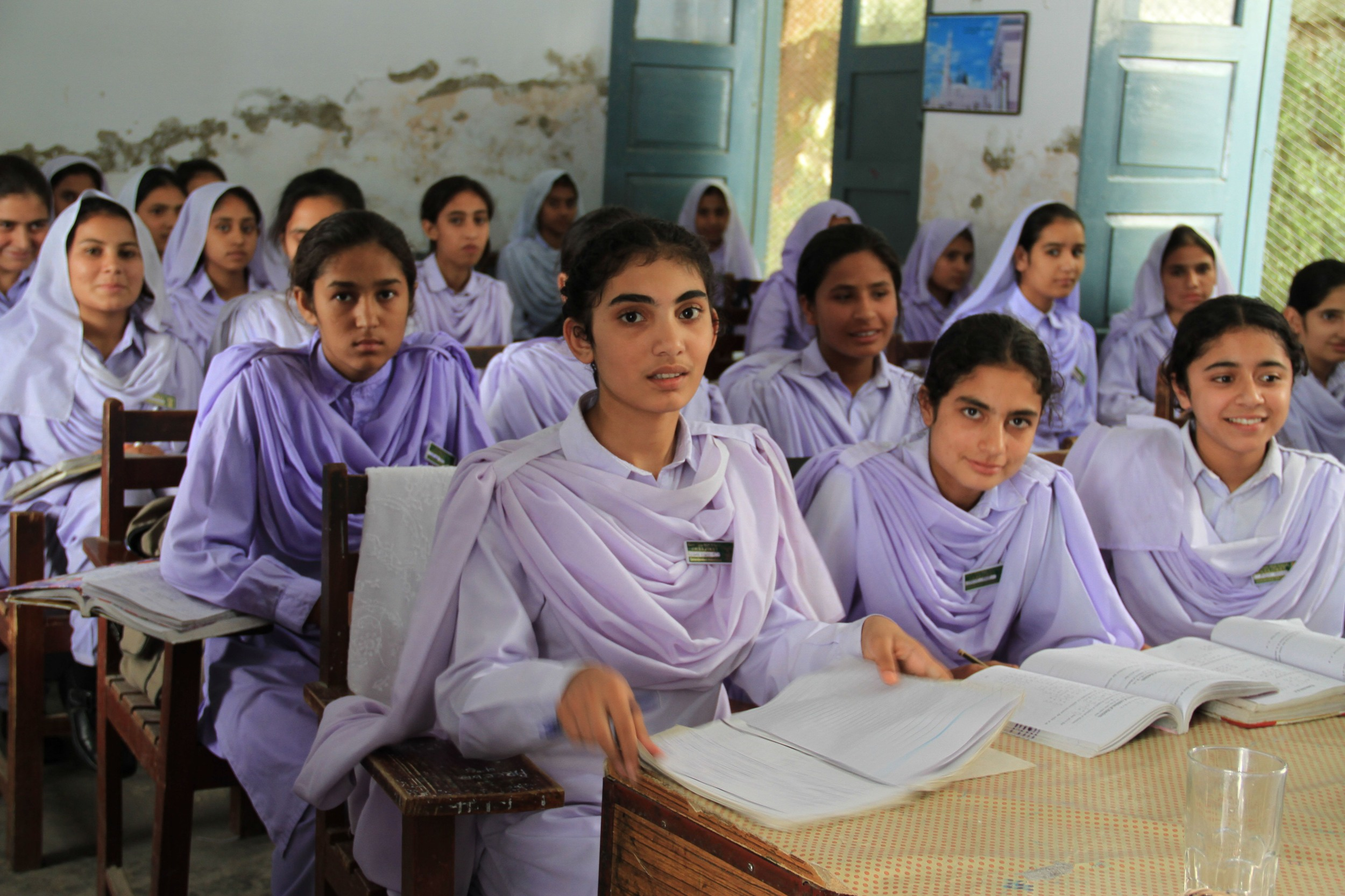
The UK government was committed to getting two million more girls into school in Pakistan by 2015. UK aid helped more than 590,000 girls in Khyber Pakhtunkhwa stay in school by giving them small cash stipends.

Stipends can be used to compensate interns at non-profit organizations, however they are discouraged to be used for volunteers as this may require that they be reported as employees and therefore tax paid on the stipend. This type of stipend is temporary and normally lasts for less than a year.

== Church stipends ==
In the Catholic Church, a Mass Stipend is a payment made by members of the church, which is generally nominal, to a priest for saying a Mass that is not part of his normal course of work. It is considered simony to demand payment for a sacrament, and thus, stipends are seen as gifts.

In the Church of England, a stipend refers to the salary of a stipendiary minister, one who receives payment directly from the diocese (as opposed to other forms of disbursement such as free use of a house in return for clerical duties, known as house-for-duty). A self-supporting minister (previously termed a non-stipendiary minister) is therefore one who is licensed to perform clerical duties but without receiving any kind of payment from the diocese, but non-stipendiary ministers often receive reimbursement of expenses incurred in pursuit of their duties such as travel, postage, and telephone costs. Non-stipendiary ministers normally depend on secular employment or pensions for their income and are often unavailable for pastoral duties when they are fulfilling their obligations to their employer.

== Criticism ==
Stipends can erode employee–employer relationship when used to hire junior teaching/research staff with lower pay and worse working conditions.

In Australia, stipends may act as a means to circumvent a church or volunteer organization's adherence and obligations under Australian Work Health and Safety (WHS) law which does not apply to volunteer associations, only to businesses which employ paid staff.

== See also ==
- Graduate assistant
- Fellow
- Honorarium – sometimes referred to as a stipend in the UK
