= List of acts of the Parliament of Victoria from 2019 =

This is a list of acts of the Parliament of Victoria, Australia for the year 2019.

== 2019 ==
| Short title, or popular name | Citation | Royal assent |
Long title
| Safe Patient Care (Nurse to Patient and Midwife to Patient Ratios) Amendment Act 2019 | No. 1 of 2019 | 26 February 2019 |
An Act to amend the Safe Patient Care (Nurse to Patient and Midwife to Patient Ratios) Act 2015 (Note: Safe Patient Care (Nurse to Patient and Midwife to Patient Ratios) Act 2015 (No. 51 of 2015)) and for other purposes.
| Integrity and Accountability Legislation Amendment (Public Interest Disclosures, Oversight and Independence) Act 2019 | No. 2 of 2019 | |
| Justice Legislation Amendment (Police and Other Matters) Act 2019 | No. 3 of 2019 | |
| Parliamentary Committees Amendment Act 2019 | No. 4 of 2019 | |
| Victorian Independent Remuneration Tribunal and Improving Parliamentary Standards Act 2019 | No. 5 of 2019 | |
| Energy Legislation Amendment (Victorian Default Offer) Act 2019 | No. 6 of 2019 | |
| Transport Legislation Amendment (Better Roads Victoria and Other Amendments) Act 2019 | No. 7 of 2019 | |
| West Gate Tunnel (Truck Bans and Traffic Management) Act 2019 | No. 8 of 2019 | |
| Fair Work (Commonwealth Powers) Amendment Act 2019 | No. 9 of 2019 | |
| Major Transport Projects Facilitation Amendment Act 2019 | No. 10 of 2019 | |
| Open Courts and Other Acts Amendment Act 2019 | No. 11 of 2019 | |
| Audit Amendment Act 2019 | No. 12 of 2019 | |
| Guardianship and Administration Act 2019 | No. 13 of 2019 | 4 June 2019 |
An Act to re-enact with amendments the law relating to guardianship and administration, to repeal the Guardianship and Administration Act 1986 (Note: Guardianship and Administration Act 1986 (No. 58 of 1986)) and to amend consequentially various other Acts and for other purposes.
| Sale of Land Amendment Act 2019 | No. 14 of 2019 | |
| Appropriation (2019-2020) Act 2019 | No. 15 of 2019 | 12 June 2019 |
An Act for the appropriation of certain sums out of the Consolidated Fund for the ordinary annual services of the Government for the financial year 2019/2020 and for other purposes.
| Appropriation (Parliament 2019-2020) Act 2019 | No. 16 of 2019 | 12 June 2019 |
An Act for the appropriation of certain sums out of the Consolidated Fund for the Parliament in respect of the financial year 2019/2020 and for other purposes.
| State Taxation Acts Amendment Act 2019 | No. 17 of 2019 | |
| Local Government (South Gippsland Shire Council) Act 2019 | No. 18 of 2019 | |
| Disability (National Disability Insurance Scheme Transition) Amendment Act 2019 | No. 19 of 2019 | |
| Firefighters' Presumptive Rights Compensation and Fire Services Legislation Amendment (Reform) Act 2019 | No. 20 of 2019 | 2 July 2019 |
An Act for an Act to provide a rebuttable presumption for career firefighters and volunteer firefighters suffering from specified forms of cancer for the purposes of claiming compensation under the Workplace Injury Rehabilitation and Compensation Act 2013, (Note: Workplace Injury Rehabilitation and Compensation Act 2013 (No. 67 of 2013)) to amend the Metropolitan Fire Brigades Act 1958, (Note: Metropolitan Fire Brigades Act 1958 (No. 6315)) the Country Fire Authority Act 1958 (Note: Country Fire Authority Act 1958 (No. 6228)) and certain other Acts to reform fire services and for other purposes.
| Essential Services Commission Amendment (Governance, Procedural and Administrative Improvements) Act 2019 | No. 21 of 2019 | |
| Public Health and Wellbeing Amendment Act 2019 | No. 22 of 2019 | |
| Water and Catchment Legislation Amendment Act 2019 | No. 23 of 2019 | |
| Assisted Reproductive Treatment Amendment (Consent) Act 2019 | No. 24 of 2019 | |
| Births, Deaths and Marriages Registration Amendment Act 2019 | No. 25 of 2019 | |
| Professional Engineers Registration Act 2019 | No. 26 of 2019 | |
| Environment Protection Amendment Act 2019 | No. 27 of 2019 | |
| Flora and Fauna Guarantee Amendment Act 2019 | No. 28 of 2019 | 10 September 2019 |
An Act to amend the Flora and Fauna Guarantee Act 1988 (Note: Flora and Fauna Guarantee Act 1988 (No. 47 of 1988)) to promote Victoria's biodiversity by establishing objectives and principles of the Act, imposing additional obligations to consider biodiversity in decision-making, improving transparency and accountability and making various other amendments to strengthen the Act and to make consequential amendments to other Acts and for other purposes.
| Public Holidays Amendment Act 2019 | No. 29 of 2019 | |
| Children Legislation Amendment Act 2019 | No. 30 of 2019 | |
| Legal Profession Uniform Law Application Amendment Act 2019 | No. 31 of 2019 | |
| Mineral Resources (Sustainable Development) Amendment Act 2019 | No. 32 of 2019 | |
| Owner Drivers and Forestry Contractors Amendment Act 2019 | No. 33 of 2019 | |
| Health Legislation Amendment and Repeal Act 2019 | No. 34 of 2019 | |
| Marine and Fisheries Legislation Amendment Act 2019 | No. 35 of 2019 | |
| Superannuation Legislation Amendment Act 2019 | No. 36 of 2019 | |
| Children's Services Amendment Act 2019 | No. 37 of 2019 | |
| Dangerous Goods Amendment (Penalty Reform) Act 2019 | No. 38 of 2019 | |
| Police Legislation Amendment (Road Safety Camera Commissioner and Other Matters) Act 2019 | No. 39 of 2019 | |
| Primary Industries Legislation Amendment Act 2019 | No. 40 of 2019 | |
| Rail Safety Legislation Amendment (National Services Delivery and Related Reforms) Act 2019 | No. 41 of 2019 | |
| Renewable Energy (Jobs and Investment) Amendment Act 2019 | No. 42 of 2019 | |
| Building Amendment (Cladding Rectification) Act 2019 | No. 43 of 2019 | |
| Justice Legislation Amendment (Criminal Appeals) Act 2019 | No. 44 of 2019 | |
| Justice Legislation Amendment (Serious Offenders and Other Matters) Act 2019 | No. 45 of 2019 | |
| State Taxation Acts Further Amendment Act 2019 | No. 46 of 2019 | |
| Consumer Legislation Amendment Act 2019 | No. 47 of 2019 | |
| Land (Revocation of Reservations) Act 2019 | No. 48 of 2019 | |
| Transport Legislation Amendment Act 2019 | No. 49 of 2019 | 3 December 2019 |
An Act to amend the Transport Integration Act 2010, (Note: Transport Integration Act 2010 (No. 6 of 2010)) the Road Safety Act 1986, (Note: Road Safety Act 1986 (No. 127 of 1986)) the Accident Towing Services Act 2007, (Note: Accident Towing Services Act 2007 (No. 30 of 2007)) the Heavy Vehicle National Law Application Act 2013, (Note: Heavy Vehicle National Law Application Act 2013 (No. 30 of 2013)) the Road Management Act 2004, (Note: Road Management Act 2004 (No. 12 of 2004)) the Transport (Compliance and Miscellaneous) Act 1983 (Note: Transport Act 1983 (No. 9921)) and the Commercial Passenger Vehicle Industry Act 2017, (Note: Commercial Passenger Vehicle Industry Act 2017 (No. 35 of 2017)) to make consequential amendments to other Acts and for other purposes.
| Workplace Safety Legislation Amendment (Workplace Manslaughter and Other Matters) Act 2019 | No. 50 of 2019 | 3 December 2019 |
An Act n Act to amend the Occupational Health and Safety Act 2004 (Note: Occupational Health and Safety Act 2004 (No. 107 of 2004)) to provide for offences of workplace manslaughter and to provide for the establishment of the Workplace Incidents Consultative Committee, to amend the Workplace Injury Rehabilitation and Compensation Act 2013 in relation to the Board of Management of the Victorian WorkCover Authority and to make consequential amendments to certain other Acts and for other purposes.

== Sources ==
- "Acts as made: 2019". Victoria Legislation.
