= List of acts of the Parliament of Victoria from 2004 =

This is a list of acts of the Parliament of Victoria, Australia for the year 2004.

== 2004 ==
Short title, or popular name	Citation	Royal assent
Long title
Nurses (Amendment) Act 2004	No. 1 of 2004	6 April 2004
An Act to amend the Nurses Act 1993 (Note: Nurses Act 1993 (No. 111 of 1993)) to provide for the endorsement of registration of nurses registered in division 2 of the register of nurses kept under that Act and for other purposes.
Gas Industry (Residual Provisions) (Amendment) Act 2004	No. 2 of 2004	
Land Tax (Amendment) Act 2004	No. 3 of 2004	
Public Prosecutions (Amendment) Act 2004	No. 4 of 2004	
Unclaimed Moneys (Amendment) Act 2004	No. 5 of 2004	
Wrongs (Remarriage Discount) Act 2004	No. 6 of 2004	
Control of Genetically Modified Crops Act 2004	No. 7 of 2004	
Limitation of Actions (Amendment) Act 2004	No. 8 of 2004	
Marine (Amendment) Act 2004	No. 9 of 2004	
Monetary Units Act 2004	No. 10 of 2004	11 May 2004
An Act to provide for fees and penalties to be fixed by reference to fee or penalty units that can be indexed annually by an amount to be fixed by the Treasurer, to amend the Sentencing Act 1991 (Note: Sentencing Act 1991 (No. 49 of 1991)) and the Subordinate Legislation Act 1994 (Note: Subordinate Legislation Act 1994 (No. 104 of 1994)) and to amend fees and penalties that are specified in certain Acts by monetary amounts and for other purposes.
Petroleum (Submerged Lands) (Amendment) Act 2004	No. 11 of 2004	
Road Management Act 2004	No. 12 of 2004	11 May 2004
An Act to reform the law relating to road management in Victoria, to amend the Transport Act 1983, (Note: Transport Act 1983 (No. 9921)) the Road Safety Act 1986 (Note: Road Safety Act 1986 (No. 127 of 1986)) and the Local Government Act 1989 (Note: Local Government Act 1989 (No. 11 of 1989)) and to make related amendments to certain other Acts and for other purposes.
Commonwealth Games Arrangements (Further Amendment) Act 2004	No. 13 of 2004	
Corrections (Further Amendment) Act 2004	No. 14 of 2004	
Crimes (Assumed Identities) Act 2004	No. 15 of 2004	
Crimes (Controlled Operations) Act 2004	No. 16 of 2004	
Estate Agents and Travel Agents Acts (Amendment) Act 2004	No. 17 of 2004	
Health Services (Supported Residential Services) Act 2004	No. 18 of 2004	
Heritage (Further Amendment) Act 2004	No. 19 of 2004	
Justice Legislation (Sexual Offences and Bail) Act 2004	No. 20 of 2004	
Land (Miscellaneous) Act 2004	No. 21 of 2004	
Primary Industries Legislation (Miscellaneous Amendments) Act 2004	No. 22 of 2004	
Transfer of Land (Electronic Transactions) Act 2004	No. 23 of 2004	
Alpine Resorts (Management) (Amendment) Act 2004	No. 24 of 2004	
Energy Legislation (Regulatory Reform) Act 2004	No. 25 of 2004	
Surveillance Devices (Amendment) Act 2004	No. 26 of 2004	
Victorian Qualifications Authority (National Registration) Act 2004	No. 27 of 2004	
Appropriation (Parliament 2004/2005) Act 2004	No. 28 of 2004	1 June 2004
An Act for the appropriation of certain sums out of the Consolidated Fund for the Parliament in respect of the financial year 2004/2005 and for other purposes.
Births, Deaths and Marriages Registration (Amendment) Act 2004	No. 29 of 2004	1 June 2004
Courts Legislation (Funds in Court) Act 2004	No. 30 of 2004	1 June 2004
Courts Legislation (Judicial Appointments) Act 2004	No. 31 of 2004	1 June 2004
Ombudsman Legislation (Police Ombudsman) Act 2004	No. 32 of 2004	1 June 2004
Private Security Act 2004	No. 33 of 2004	1 June 2004
An Act to provide for the licensing or registration of certain participants in the private security industry, to otherwise regulate that industry, to amend the Private Agents Act 1966 (Note: Private Agents Act 1966 (No. 7494)) and for other purposes.
Appeal Costs and Penalty Interest Rates Acts (Amendment) Act 2004	No. 34 of 2004	
Architects (Amendment) Act 2004	No. 35 of 2004	
Death Notification Legislation (Amendment) Act 2004	No. 36 of 2004	
Domestic Building Contracts (Amendment) Act 2004	No. 37 of 2004	
Judicial Salaries Act 2004 (repealed)	No. 38 of 2004	8 June 2004
An Act to remove the function of the Judicial Remuneration Tribunal to make determinations in relation to the salaries and allowances of judicial officers and the remuneration of acting magistrates and make fresh provision with respect to such salaries, allowances and remuneration, to amend the Judicial Remuneration Tribunal Act 1995 (Note: Judicial Remuneration Tribunal Act 1995 (No. 22 of 1995)) and make consequential amendments to the Constitution Act 1975, (Note: Constitution Act 1975 (No. 8750)) the County Court Act 1958 (Note: County Court Act 1958 (No. 6230)) and the Magistrates' Court Act 1989 (Note: Magistrates' Court Act 1989 (No. 51 of 1989)) and for other purposes. (Repealed by Judicial Entitlements Act 2015 (No. 29 of 2015))
Mitcham-Frankston Project Act 2004 or the EastLink Project Act 2004	No. 39 of 2004	8 June 2004
An Act to make provision in relation to the construction and management of the Mitcham-Frankston Freeway, to amend section 85 of the Constitution Act 1975 and the Road Management Act 2004 (Note: Road Management Act 2004 (No. 12 of 2004)) and other Acts and for other purposes.
Treasury and Finance Legislation (Amendment) Act 2004	No. 40 of 2004	
Crimes (Amendment) Act 2004	No. 41 of 2004	
Fair Trading (Consumer Contracts) Act 2004	No. 42 of 2004	
Financial Management (Amendment) Act 2004	No. 43 of 2004	
Mental Health Legislation (Commonwealth Detainees) Act 2004	No. 44 of 2004	
Racing and Gaming Acts (Amendment) Act 2004	No. 45 of 2004	
State Taxation Acts (Tax Reform) Act 2004	No. 46 of 2004	
Surveying Act 2004	No. 47 of 2004	16 June 2004
An Act to provide for the management of cadastral surveying, to repeal the Surveyors Act 1978 (Note: Surveyors Act 1978 (No. 9180)) and for other purposes.
Sustainable Forests (Timber) Act 2004	No. 48 of 2004	
Transport Legislation (Miscellaneous Amendments) Act 2004	No. 49 of 2004	
Appropriation (2004/2005) Act 2004	No. 50 of 2004	22 June 2004
An Act for the appropriation of certain sums out of the Consolidated Fund for the ordinary annual services of the Government for the financial year 2004/2005 and for other purposes.
Ambulance Services (Amendment) Act 2004	No. 51 of 2004	
Health Services (Governance and Accountability) Act 2004	No. 52 of 2004	
Victorian Civil and Administrative Tribunal (Amendment) Act 2004	No. 53 of 2004	
Gambling Regulation (Amendment) Act 2004	No. 54 of 2004	
Parliamentary Salaries and Superannuation (Amendment) Act 2004	No. 55 of 2004	
Sex Offenders Registration Act 2004	No. 56 of 2004	21 September 2004
An Act to require certain offenders who commit sexual offences to keep police informed of their whereabouts and other personal details for a period of time and thereby reduce the likelihood that they will re-offend and facilitate the investigation and prosecution of any future offences that they may commit, to prevent registered sex offenders working in child-related employment, to amend the Ombudsman Act 1973 (Note: Ombudsman Act 1973 (No. 8414)) and for other purposes.
Water Industry (Environmental Contributions) Act 2004	No. 57 of 2004	
Aboriginal Lands (Amendment) Act 2004	No. 58 of 2004	
Crimes (Dangerous Driving) Act 2004	No. 59 of 2004	
Evidence (Witness Identity Protection) Act 2004	No. 60 of 2004	
Interpretation of Legislation (Amendment) Act 2004	No. 61 of 2004	
Major Crime (Special Investigations Monitor) Act 2004	No. 62 of 2004	
Major Crime Legislation (Office of Police Integrity) Act 2004	No. 63 of 2004	
National Parks (Additions and Other Amendments) Act 2004 (repealed)	No. 64 of 2004	
(Repealed by Statute Law Revision Act 2013 (No. 70 of 2013)
Sentencing (Superannuation Orders) Act 2004	No. 65 of 2004	
Building (Amendment) Act 2004	No. 66 of 2004	
Dangerous Goods Legislation (Amendment) Act 2004	No. 67 of 2004	
Magistrates' Court (Increased Civil Jurisdiction) Act 2004	No. 68 of 2004	
Primary Industries Legislation (Further Miscellaneous Amendments) Act 2004	No. 69 of 2004	
State Sport Centres (Amendment) Act 2004	No. 70 of 2004	
State Taxation Acts (Amendment) Act 2004	No. 71 of 2004	
Children and Young Persons (Age Jurisdiction) Act 2004	No. 72 of 2004	
Constitution (Recognition of Aboriginal People) Act 2004	No. 73 of 2004	9 November 2004
An Act to amend the Constitution Act 1975 to give recognition within that Act to Victoria's Aboriginal people and their contribution to the State of Victoria.
Drugs, Poisons and Controlled Substances and Therapeutic Goods (Victoria) Acts (Amendment) Act 2004	No. 74 of 2004	
Essential Services Commission (Amendment) Act 2004	No. 75 of 2004	
Limitation of Actions (Adverse Possession) Act 2004	No. 76 of 2004	
Magistrates' Court (Family Violence) Act 2004	No. 77 of 2004	
Parliamentary Superannuation Legislation (Reform) Act 2004	No. 78 of 2004	
Major Crime (Investigative Powers) Act 2004	No. 79 of 2004	
Pharmacy Practice Act 2004	No. 80 of 2004	
Planning and Environment (General Amendment) Act 2004	No. 81 of 2004	
State Concessions Act 2004	No. 82 of 2004	
Teaching Service (Conduct and Performance) Act 2004	No. 83 of 2004	
Commonwealth Powers (De Facto Relationships) Act 2004	No. 84 of 2004	23 November 2004
An Act to refer certain financial matters arising out of the breakdown of de facto relationships to the Parliament of the Commonwealth for the purposes of section 51(xxxvii) of the Constitution of the Commonwealth and for other purposes.
Electoral Legislation (Amendment) Act 2004	No. 85 of 2004	
Electricity Industry (Wind Energy Development) 2004	No. 86 of 2004	
Major Crime Legislation (Seizure of Assets) Act 2004	No. 87 of 2004	
Petroleum Products (Terminal Gate Pricing) (Amendment) Act 2004	No. 88 of 2004	
Children and Young Persons (Koori Court) Act 2004 (repealed)	No. 89 of 2004	
(Repealed by Legislation Reform (Repeals No. 3) Act 2008 (No. 53 of 2008))
Construction Industry Long Service Leave (Amendment) Act 2004	No. 90 of 2004	
Energy Legislation (Amendment) Act 2004	No. 91 of 2004	
Liquor Control Reform (Underage Drinking and Enhanced Enforcement) Act 2004	No. 92 of 2004	
Mildura College Lands (Amendment) Act 2004	No. 93 of 2004	
Transport Accident (Amendment) Act 2004	No. 94 of 2004	
World Swimming Championships Act 2004	No. 95 of 2004	7 December 2004
An Act to provide for the staging, conduct and management of the 2007 World Swimming Championships, to establish the 2007 World Swimming Championships Corporation and provide for its powers and functions, to provide for various matters in relation to commercial arrangements, including the use of logos, images and certain references and the authorisation of broadcasting, filming and certain advertising in respect of the 2007 World Swimming Championships, to amend the Borrowing and Investment Powers Act 1987 (Note: Borrowing and Investment Powers Act 1987 (No. 13 of 1987)) and for other purposes.
Building (Cooling Towers and Plumbing) (Amendment) Act 2004	No. 96 of 2004	
Corrections and Major Crime (Investigative Powers) Acts (Amendment) Act 2004	No. 97 of 2004	
Emergency Services Telecommunications Authority Act 2004	No. 98 of 2004	14 December 2004
An Act to make provision for certain emergency services telecommunications services and other communications services by the establishment of an authority and other related matters and for other purposes.
Legal Profession Act 2004 (repealed)	No. 99 of 2004	14 December 2004
An Act to improve the regulation of the legal profession, principally by implementing national model provisions for the regulation of the profession and establishing new bodies responsible for regulating it, to facilitate the regulation of legal practice on a national basis across State and Territory borders, to repeal the Legal Practice Act 1996, (Note: Legal Practice Act 1996 (No. 35 of 1996)) to make consequential amendments to Acts and for other purposes. (Repealed by Legal Profession Uniform Law Application Act 2014 (No. 17 of 2014))
Multicultural Victoria Act 2004 (repealed)	No. 100 of 2004	14 December 2004
An Act to establish principles of multiculturalism, to provide for the re-establishment of the Victorian Multicultural Commission, to establish reporting requirements for government departments in relation to multiculturalism, to repeal the Victorian Multicultural Commission Act 1993 (Note: Ethnic Affairs Commission Act 1993 (No. 26 of 1993)) and for other purposes. (Repealed by Multicultural Victoria Act 2011 (No. 14 of 2011)
Planning and Environment (Development Contributions) Act 2004	No. 101 of 2004	
Accident Compensation Legislation (Amendment) Act 2004	No. 102 of 2004	
Fair Trading (Enhanced Compliance) Act 2004	No. 103 of 2004	
Gambling Regulation (Further Amendment) Act 2004	No. 104 of 2004	
Heritage (World Heritage) Act 2004	No. 105 of 2004	
Housing (Housing Agencies) Act 2004	No. 106 of 2004	
Occupational Health and Safety Act 2004	No. 107 of 2004	21 December 2004
An Act to promote and improve standards for occupational health, safety and welfare, to repeal the Occupational Health and Safety Act 1985 (Note: Occupational Health and Safety Act 1985 (No. 10190)) and for other purposes.
Public Administration Act 2004	No. 108 of 2004	21 December 2004
An Act to provide a framework for good governance in the Victorian public sector and in public administration generally in Victoria, to establish a State Services Authority, to repeal the Public Sector Management and Employment Act 1998 (Note: Public Sector Management and Employment Act 1998 (No. 45 of 1998)) and the Public Sector Reform (Miscellaneous Amendments) Act 1998, (Note: Public Sector Reform (Miscellaneous Amendments) Act 1998 (No. 46 of 1998)) to amend the Constitution Act 1975 and the Parliamentary Officers Act 1975, (Note: Parliamentary Officers Act 1975 (No. 8730)) to make consequential amendments to certain other Acts and for other purposes.
Safety on Public Land Act 2004	No. 109 of 2004	21 December 2004
Transport Legislation (Amendment) Act 2004	No. 110 of 2004	21 December 2004
An Act to amend various Acts relating to transport and for other purposes.

== Sources ==
- "Acts as made: 2004". Victoria Legislation.
