= List of acts of the Parliament of Victoria from 1996 =

This is a list of acts of the Parliament of Victoria, Australia for the year 1996.

== 1996 ==
| Short title, or popular name | Citation | Royal assent |
Long title
| Biological Control (Amendment) Act 1996 (repealed) | No. 1 of 1996 | 18 June 1996 |
An Act to amend the Biological Control Act 1986 (Note: Biological Control Act 1986 (No. 57 of 1986)) and for other purposes. (Repealed by Statute Law Revision Act 2000 (No. 74 of 2000))
| Domestic Building Contracts and Tribunal (Amendment) Act 1996 | No. 2 of 1996 | |
| Legal Profession Practice (Direct Mortgages) Act 1996 | No. 3 of 1996 | |
| Superannuation Acts (Amendment) Act 1996 | No. 4 of 1996 | |
| Appropriation (Interim 1996/97) Act 1996 (repealed) | No. 5 of 1996 | 25 June 1996 |
An Act to make interim appropriation of moneys out of the Consolidated Fund for recurrent services and for certain works and services for the period July to October 1996. (Repealed by Statute Law Revision Act 2000 (No. 74 of 2000))
| Appropriation (Parliament) (Interim 1996/97) Act 1996 (repealed) | No. 6 of 1996 | 25 June 1996 |
An Act to make interim appropriation of moneys out of the Consolidated Fund for recurrent services and for certain works and services for the Parliament for the period July to October 1996. (Repealed by Statute Law Revision Act 2000 (No. 74 of 2000))
| Accident Compensation (Amendment) Act 1996 | No. 7 of 1996 | 25 June 1996 |
An Act to amend the Accident Compensation Act 1985 (Note: Accident Compensation Act 1985 (No. 10191)) and the Accident Compensation (WorkCover Insurance) Act 1993 (Note: Accident Compensation (WorkCover Insurance) Act 1993 (No. 50 of 1993)) and for other purposes.
| Electricity Industry (Amendment) Act 1996 (repealed) | No. 8 of 1996 | 25 June 1996 |
An Act to amend the Electricity Industry Act 1993 (Note: Electricity Industry Act 1993 (No. 130 of 1993)) and certain other Acts and for other purposes. (Repealed by Legislation Reform (Repeals No. 2) Act 2008 (No. 16 of 2008))
| Parliament House Completion Authority Act 1996 | No. 9 of 1996 | 25 June 1996 |
An Act to establish an Authority to control the improvement, refurbishment, alteration, extension and completion of Parliament House, to abolish the Public Bodies Review Committee and change the names and functions of two other Parliamentary Committees, to amend the Parliamentary Committees Act 1968 (Note: Parliamentary Committees Act 1968 (No. 7727)) and certain other Acts for other purposes.
| State Taxation (Omnibus Amendment) Act 1996 (repealed) | No. 10 of 1996 | 25 June 1996 |
An Act to make miscellaneous amendments to the Business Franchise (Tobacco) Act 1974, (Note: Business Franchise (Tobacco) Act 1974 (No. 8597)) the Debits Tax Act 1990, (Note: Debits Tax Act 1990 (No. 78 of 1990-)) the Financial Institutions Duty Act 1982, (Note: Financial Institutions Duty Act 1982 (No. 9850)) the Land Tax Act 1958, (Note: Land Tax Act 1958 (No. 6289)) the Pay-roll Tax Act 1971, (Note: Pay-roll Tax Act 1971 (No. 8154)) the Stamps Act 1958 (Note: Stamps Act 1958 (No. 6375)) and the Valuation of Land Act 1960 (Note: Valuation of Land Act 1960 (No. 6653)) and for other purposes. (Repealed by Statute Law Revision Act 2000 (No. 74 of 2000))
| Victorian Managed Insurance Authority Act 1996 | No. 11 of 1996 | 25 June 1996 |
An Act to establish the Victorian Managed Insurance Authority and for other purposes.
| Water Acts (Amendment) Act 1996 | No. 12 of 1996 | |
| Accident Compensation (Occupational Health and Safety) Act 1996 | No. 13 of 1996 | 28 June 1996 |
An Act to further amend the Accident Compensation Act 1985, to amend the Dangerous Goods Act 1985, (Note: Dangerous Goods Act 1985 (No. 10189)) the Equipment (Public Safety) Act 1994, (Note: Equipment (Public Safety) Act 1994 (No. 21 of 1994)) and the Occupational Health and Safety Act 1985 (Note: Occupational Health and Safety Act 1985 (No. 10190)) and for other purposes.
| Ballarat Lands (Lakeside Development) Act 1996 | No. 14 of 1996 | |
| Firearms (Prohibited Firearms) Act 1996 | No. 15 of 1996 | |
| Forests (Wood Pulp Agreement) Act 1996 | No. 16 of 1996 | |
| Gaming Acts (Amendment) Act 1996 (repealed) | No. 17 of 1996 | 2 July 1996 |
An Act to make miscellaneous amendments to the Gaming Machine Control Act 1991, (Note: Gaming Machine Control Act 1991 (No. 53 of 1991)) the Casino Control Act 1991, (Note: Casino Control Act 1991 (No. 47 of 1991)) the Gaming and Betting Act 1994, (Note: Gaming and Betting Act 1994 (No. 37 of 1994)) the Lotteries Gaming and Betting Act 1966, (Note: Lotteries Gaming and Betting Act 1966 (No. 7429)) the Racing Act 1958 (Note: Racing Act 1958 (No. 6353)) and the Casino (Management Agreement) Act 1993 (Note: Casino (Management Agreement) Act 1993 (No. 94 of 1993)) and for other purposes. (Repealed by Statute Law Revision Act 2000 (No. 74 of 2000))
| Gaming Machine Control (Community Support Fund) Act 1996 | No. 18 of 1996 | 2 July 1996 |
| Health Acts (Amendment) Act 1996 | No. 19 of 1996 | 2 July 1996 |
| Housing (Amendment) Act 1996 (repealed) | No. 20 of 1996 | 2 July 1996 |
(Repealed by Legislation Reform (Repeals No. 1) Act 2008 (No. 10 of 2008))
| Melbourne City Link (Amendment) Act 1996 | No. 21 of 1996 | 2 July 1996 |
| Miscellaneous Acts (Omnibus Amendments) Act 1996 | No. 22 of 1996 | 2 July 1996 |
An Act to prohibit, except in certain circumstances, the detention or immobilisation of motor vehicles that enter on certain land, to regulate the removal of vehicles from certain areas, to enable a breach of parking restrictions on private property to be prosecuted where the owner or occupier has entered into a parking services agreement with the municipal council, to amend the Road Safety Act 1986 (Note: Road Safety Act 1986 (No. 127 of 1986)) and for other purposes.
| Police Regulation (Selection and Review) Act 1996 (repealed) | No. 23 of 1996 | 2 July 1996 |
An Act to amend the Police Regulation Act 1958 (Note: Police Regulation Act 1958 (No. 6338)) and for other purposes. (Repealed by Statute Law Revision Act 2000 (No. 74 of 2000))
| Public Sector Management and Parliamentary Officers (Amendment) Act 1996 | No. 24 of 1996 | 2 July 1996 |
| Road Safety (Wheel Clamping) Act 1996 (repealed) | No. 25 of 1996 | 2 July 1996 |
(Repealed by Statute Law Revision Act 2000 (No. 74 of 2000))
| Westpac and Bank of Melbourne (Challenge Bank) Act 1996 | No. 26 of 1996 | 2 July 1996 |
An Act to provide for the transfer to Westpac Banking Corporation of the banking business of Challenge Bank Limited and the transfer to Bank of Melbourne Limited of part of that business and for other purposes.
| Statute Law Revision (Marine) Act 1996 (repealed) | No. 27 of 1996 | 24 September 1996 |
An Act to make minor amendments of a statute law revision nature to the Ports Acts (Amendment) Act 1995, (Note: Ports Acts (Amendment) Act 1995 (No. 23 of 1995)) the Port Services Act 1995 (Note: Port Services Act 1995 (No. 82 of 1995)) and the Marine Act 1988. (Note: Marine Act 1988 (No. 52 of 1988)) (Repealed by Statute Law Revision Act 2000 (No. 74 of 2000))
| Transport (Rail Safety) Act 1996 | No. 28 of 1996 | 22 October 1996 |
An Act to amend the Transport Act 1983 (Note: Transport Act 1983 (No. 9921)) and the Public Transport Competition Act 1995 (Note: Public Transport Competition Act 1995 (No. 68 of 1995)) and for other purposes.
| Forestry Rights Act 1996 (repealed) | No. 29 of 1996 | 22 October 1996 |
An Act to provide for the creation of forest property rights and for other purposes. (Repealed by Climate Change Act 2010 (No. 54 of 2010))
| Geelong Lands (Steampacket Place) Act 1996 | No. 30 of 1996 | 22 October 1996 |
An Act to enable the granting of long term leases for certain land in Geelong and for other purposes.
| Appropriation (1996/97, No. 1) Act 1996 | No. 31 of 1996 | 22 October 1996 |
An Act to appropriate certain sums out of the Consolidated Fund for recurrent services and for certain works and services for the financial year 1996/97 and to appropriate the supplies granted for recurrent services and for certain works and services under the Appropriation (Interim 1996/97) Act 1996 (Note: Appropriation (Interim 1996/97) Act 1996 (No. 5 of 1996)) and for other purposes.
| Appropriation (Parliament 1996/97, No. 1) Act 1996 | No. 32 of 1996 | 22 October 1996 |
An Act to appropriate moneys out of the Consolidated Fund for recurrent services and for certain works and services for the Parliament for the financial year 1996/97 and to appropriate the supplies granted for recurrent services and for certain works and services under the Appropriation (Parliament) (Interim 1996/97) Act 1996 (Note: Appropriation (Parliament) (Interim 1996/97) Act 1996 (No. 6 of 1996)) and for other purposes.
| Bank of South Australia and Advance Bank Act 1996 | No. 33 of 1996 | 29 October 1996 |
An Act to extend the operation of a South Australian Act (Note: Bank Merger (BankSA and Advance Bank) Act 1996 (No. 41 (SA))) dealing with the merger of the Bank of South Australia and Advance Bank and for other purposes.
| Local Government (Amendment) Act 1996 (repealed) | No. 34 of 1996 | |
(Repealed by Statute Law Revision Act 2000 (No. 74 of 2000))
| Legal Practice Act 1996 | No. 35 of 1996 | 6 November 1996 |
An Act to improve the regulation of legal practice in Victoria, to amend and repeal the Legal Profession Practice Act 1958, (Note: Legal Profession Practice Act 1958 (No. 6291)) to amend the Partnership Act 1958, (Note: Partnership Act 1958 (No. 6330)) to make consequential amendments to other Acts and for other purposes.
| Professional Boxing and Martial Arts Act 1996 (repealed) | No. 36 of 1996 | |
(Repealed by Statute Law Repeals Act 2012 (No. 30 of 2012))
| Road Safety (Amendment) Act 1996 | No. 37 of 1996 | |
| Shop Trading Reform Act 1996 | No. 38 of 1996 | 6 November 1996 |
An Act to provide for the management of shop trading in Victoria, to repeal the Shop Trading Act 1987 (Note: Shop Trading Act 1987 (No. 10 of 1987)) and the Capital City (Shop Trading) Act 1992 (Note: Capital City (Shop Trading) Act 1992 (No. 66 of 1992)) and for other purposes.
| Building (Amendment) Act 1996 (repealed) | No. 39 of 1996 | |
(Repealed by Legislation Reform (Repeals No. 3) Act 2008 (No. 53 of 2008))
| Farm Produce Wholesale (Amendment) Act 1996 (repealed) | No. 40 of 1996 | |
(Repealed by Legislation Reform (Repeals No. 2) Act 2008 (No. 16 of 2008))
| Gaming Machine Control (Amendment) Act 1996 (repealed) | No. 41 of 1996 | |
(Repealed by Statute Law Revision Act 2000 (No. 74 of 2000))
| State Taxation (Further Omnibus Amendment) Act 1996 | No. 42 of 1996 | |
| Births, Deaths and Marriages Registration Act 1996 | No. 43 of 1996 | 26 November 1996 |
An Act to re-enact with amendments the law relating to births, deaths and marriages in Victoria, to repeal the Registration of Births Deaths and Marriages Act 1959 (Note: Registration of Births Deaths and Marriages Act 1959 (No. 6564)) and for other purposes.
| Children and Young Persons (Miscellaneous Amendments) Act 1996 (repealed) | No. 44 of 1996 | |
(Repealed by Legislation Reform (Repeals No. 1) Act 2008 (No. 10 of 2008))
| Corrections (Amendment) Act 1996 (repealed) | No. 45 of 1996 | |
(Repealed by Legislation Reform (Repeals No. 2) Act 2008 (No. 16 of 2008))
| Crimes (Female Genital Mutilation) Act 1996 (repealed) | No. 46 of 1996 | |
(Repealed by Statute Law Revision Act 2000 (No. 74 of 2000))
| Education (Amendment) Act 1996 (repealed) | No. 47 of 1996 | |
(Repealed by Statute Law Revision Act 2000 (No. 74 of 2000))
| Electricity Industry (Further Amendment) Act 1996 (repealed) | No. 48 of 1996 | |
(Repealed by Statute Law Revision Act 2000 (No. 74 of 2000))
| Land (Revocation of Reservations) Act 1996 | No. 49 of 1996 | |
| North Melbourne Lands Act 1996 | No. 50 of 1996 | |
| Port Services and Marine (Amendment) Act 1996 (repealed) | No. 51 of 1996 | |
(Repealed by Statute Law Revision Act 2000 (No. 74 of 2000))
| Small Business Victoria (Repeal) Act 1996 | No. 52 of 1996 | |
| Children's Services Act 1996 | No. 53 of 1996 | |
| Lord Mayor's Charitable Fund Act 1996 | No. 54 of 1996 | 10 December 1996 |
An Act to repeal and re-enact with amendments the Lord Mayor's Fund Act 1930 (Note: Lord Mayor's Fund Act 1930 (No. 3915)) and for other purposes.
| Mental Health (Interstate Provisions) Act 1996 (repealed) | No. 55 of 1996 | |
(Repealed by Statute Law Revision Act 2000 (No. 74 of 2000))
| Optometrists Registration Act 1996 | No. 56 of 1996 | |
| University Acts (Amendment) Act 1996 | No. 57 of 1996 | |
| Witness Protection (Amendment) Act 1996 (repealed) | No. 58 of 1996 | |
(Repealed by Statute Law Revision Act 2000 (No. 74 of 2000))
| Commonwealth Powers (Industrial Relations) Act 1996 (repealed) | No. 59 of 1996 | 12 December 1996 |
An Act to refer to the Parliament of the Commonwealth certain matters relating to industrial relations and for other purposes. (Repealed by Fair Work (Commonwealth Powers) Act 2009 (No. 24 of 2009))
| Accident Compensation (Further Amendment) Act 1996 | No. 60 of 1996 | 17 December 1996 |
An Act to make further amendments to the Accident Compensation Act 1985 and the Accident Compensation (WorkCover Insurance) Act 1993 and certain other Acts and for other purposes.
| Arts Institutions (Amendment) Act 1996 (repealed) | No. 61 of 1996 | |
(Repealed by Statute Law Revision Act 2000 (No. 74 of 2000))
| Casino (Management Agreement) (Amendment) Act 1996 (repealed) | No. 62 of 1996 | |
(Repealed by Statute Law Revision Act 2000 (No. 74 of 2000))
| Chiropractors Registration Act 1996 | No. 63 of 1996 | |
| Courts and Tribunals (General Amendment) Act 1996 | No. 64 of 1996 | |
| Environment Protection (Amendment) Act 1996 (repealed) | No. 65 of 1996 | |
(Repealed by Legislation Reform (Repeals No. 2) Act 2008 (No. 16 of 2008))
| Firearms Act 1996 | No. 66 of 1996 | 17 December 1996 |
An Act to re-enact, with amendments, the Firearms Act 1958 (Note: Firearms Act 1958 (No. 6251)) to make various consequential amendments to other Acts and for other purposes.
| Fisheries (Amendment) Act 1996 (repealed) | No. 67 of 1996 | 17 December 1996 |
(Repealed by Statute Law Revision Act 2000 (No. 74 of 2000))
| Health Acts (Further Amendment) Act 1996 (repealed) | No. 68 of 1996 | 17 December 1996 |
(Repealed by Statute Law Revision Act 2000 (No. 74 of 2000))
| Land (Further Revocation of Reservations) Act 1996 | No. 69 of 1996 | 17 December 1996 |
| Magistrates' Court (Amendment) Act 1996 | No. 70 of 1996 | 17 December 1996 |
An Act to amend the Magistrates' Court Act 1989 (Note: Magistrates' Court Act 1989 (No. 51 of 1989)) and for other purposes.
| Melbourne Convention and Exhibition Trust Act 1996 or the Victorian Convention and Event Trust Act 1996 | No. 71 of 1996 | 17 December 1996 |
An Act to establish a Melbourne Convention and Exhibition Trust to manage convention and exhibition facilities and services and to carry out certain other functions, to abolish the Melbourne Exhibition Centre Trust, to repeal the Melbourne Exhibition Centre Act 1994 (Note: Melbourne Exhibition Centre Act 1994 (No. 41 of 1994)) and for other purposes.
| Melbourne Exhibition Centre (Amendment) Act 1996 | No. 72 of 1996 | 17 December 1996 |
An Act to amend the Melbourne Exhibition Centre Act 1994 to make further provision for the Melbourne Exhibition Centre land and for other purposes.
| Miscellaneous Acts (Further Omnibus Amendments) Act 1996 | No. 73 of 1996 | 17 December 1996 |
| Motor Car Traders (Amendment) Act 1996 (repealed) | No. 74 of 1996 | 17 December 1996 |
(Repealed by Statute Law Revision Act 2000 (No. 74 of 2000))
| Osteopaths Registration Act 1996 | No. 75 of 1996 | 17 December 1996 |
| Pipelines (Amendment) Act 1996 | No. 76 of 1996 | 17 December 1996 |
| Planning and Environment (Planning Schemes) Act 1996 | No. 77 of 1996 | 17 December 1996 |
| Queen Victoria Market Lands Act 1996 | No. 78 of 1996 | 17 December 1996 |
An Act to revoke the permanent reservations and Crown grants and provide for the surrender of certain land in relation to the Queen Victoria Market site, to provide for the granting of that land to the City of Melbourne, to repeal the Melbourne General Market Site Act 1877, (Note: Melbourne General Market Site Act 1877 (41 Vict. No. 572)) the Melbourne Lands Exchange Act 1904 (Note: Melbourne Lands Exchange Act 1904 (4 Edw. VII. No. 1949)) and the Melbourne General Market Lands Act 1917 (Note: Melbourne General Market Lands Act 1917 (8 Geo. V. No. 2913)) and for other purposes.
| Rail Corporations Act 1996 or the Rail Management Act 1996 | No. 79 of 1996 | 17 December 1996 |
An Act to establish V/Line Freight and Victorian Rail Track, to amend the Borrowing and Investment Powers Act 1987, (Note: Borrowing and Investment Powers Act 1987 (No. 13 of 1987)) the Transport Act 1983 and the Treasury Corporation of Victoria Act 1992 (Note: Treasury Corporation of Victoria Act 1992 (No. 80 of 1992)) and for other purposes.
| Stock (Seller Liability and Declarations) (Amendment) Act 1996 (repealed) | No. 80 of 1996 | 17 December 1996 |
An Act to make miscellaneous amendments to the Stock (Seller Liability and Declarations) Act 1993 (Note: Stock (Seller Liability and Declarations) Act 1993 (No. 113 of 1993)) and for other purposes. (Repealed by Statute Law Revision Act 2000 (No. 74 of 2000))
| Victims of Crime Assistance Act 1996 | No. 81 of 1996 | 17 December 1996 |
An Act to provide assistance to victims of crime, to repeal the Criminal Injuries Compensation Act 1983, (Note: Criminal Injuries Compensation Act 1983 (No. 9992)) to amend the Sentencing Act 1991 (Note: Sentencing Act 1991 (No. 49 of 1991)) and for other purposes.
| Superannuation Acts (Further Amendment) Act 1996 | No. 82 of 1996 | 23 December 1996 |
An Act to amend the Coal Mines (Pensions) Act 1958, (Note: Coal Mines Act 1958 (No. 6221)) the Emergency Services Superannuation Act 1986, (Note: Emergency Services Superannuation Act 1986 (No. 94 of 1986)) the Hospitals Superannuation Act 1988, (Note: Hospitals Superannuation Act 1988 (No. 21 of 1988)) the Local Authorities Superannuation Act 1988, (Note: Local Authorities Superannuation Act 1988 (No. 23 of 1988)) the Port of Geelong Authority Act 1958, (Note: Geelong Harbor Trust Act 1958 (No. 6262)) the Parliamentary Salaries and Superannuation Act 1968, (Note: Parliamentary Salaries and Superannuation Act 1968 (No. 7723)) the Public Sector Superannuation (Administration) Act 1993, (Note: Public Sector Superannuation (Administration) Act 1993 (No. 110 of 1993)) the State Employees Retirement Benefits Act 1979, (Note: State Employees Retirement Benefits Act 1979 (No. 9363)) the State Superannuation Act 1988, (Note: State Superannuation Act 1988 (No. 50 of 1988)) the Superannuation (Portability) Act 1989 (Note: Superannuation (Portability) Act 1989 (No. 14 of 1989)) and the Transport Superannuation Act 1988 (Note: Transport Superannuation Act 1988 (No. 33 of 1988)) and for other purposes.
| Friendly Societies (Victoria) Act 1996 | No. 83 of 1996 | 23 December 1996 |
An Act to provide for the formation, registration, management and regulation of friendly societies, to repeal the Friendly Societies Act 1986 (Note: Friendly Societies Act 1986 (No. 119 of 1986)) and make consequential amendments to other Acts, and for other purposes.
| Co-operatives Act 1996 (repealed) | No. 84 of 1996 | 23 December 1996 |
An Act to provide for the formation, registration and management of co-operatives, to repeal the Co-operation Act 1981 (Note: Co-operation Act 1981 (No. 8718)) and to repeal Part VI of the Housing Act 1983 (Note: Housing Act 1983 (No. 10020)) and for other purposes. (Repealed by Co-operatives National Law Application Act 2013 (No. 9 of 2013))

== Sources ==
- "Acts as made: 1996". Victoria Legislation.
