= CSG Limited =

Australian technology company

- Formerly: Connected Solutions Group
- Company type: Public
- Traded as: ASX: CSV
- Industry: Printing
- Founded: February 1999
- Defunct: December 2020
- Fate: Taken over by Fuji Xerox
- Headquarters: Melbourne, Australia
- Area served: Australia and New Zealand
- Products: Print Solutions and Managed Print Services
- Revenue: $218 million (2019)
- Number of employees: 600 (2019)
- Divisions: Business Solutions, Finance Solutions, Enterprise Print Solutions
- Website: www.csg.com.au

CSG Limited was a publicly listed Australian-owned business technology company. Founded in 1988, in 2007 it was listed on the Australian Securities Exchange. In 2020, it was taken over by Fuji Xerox and integrated into Fujifilm with the brand retired.

== History ==
In February 1999, a Connected Solutions Group was founded when several businesses in Darwin merged.

In 2007, CSG was listed on the Australian Securities Exchange and it expanded into the IT Services market. A year later, the company acquired the Commander Managed Services business in the Australian Capital Territory and won a Government of the Northern Territory contract to supply desktop and server management throughout the Territory. The business also expanded its print services business in regional Queensland.

CSG also acquired Change Corporation in 2007 and entered into the IT consulting and integration services market for AUS $20 million.

Seeking to have a national footprint, CSG terminated its relationship with Fuji Xerox in favour of Canon but was subsequently required to give existing customers the option of remaining with CSG or novating to Fuji Xerox A year later, CSG acquired the exclusive distributorship of Konica Minolta Business Solutions in New Zealand as the majority shareholders as well as acquiring the largest dealership of Canon devices in Australia.

In October 2011, a takeover offer was received by the CSG board. Shortly thereafter, the company reported that other bidders had emerged. However, in December CSG announced that it was withdrawing from the process.

In July 2012, CSG sold the Technology Solutions business to NEC. Subsequently, CSG undertook an extensive business restructure to stabilise the remaining print business and position it for future growth. CSG employed approximately 600 staff.

In October 2019, Fuji Xerox made a successful takeover offer for CSG. In February 2020, CSG was delisted from the Australian Securities Exchange and integrated into Fujifilm with the brand retired in December 2020.
