= Safety in Australia =

In common with most of Europe and North America, Australian state parliaments have responded to workplace illness, injury, and death by enacting legislation regulating workplace hazards. Until the 1970s and 80s, these standards were generally detailed and technical, focusing mainly on prescriptive measures such as specifying machinery guarding measures to be adopted to prevent injury to workers operating dangerous machinery. Beginning in 2008, state and federal regulations were harmonised, giving greater clarity and consistency in the legislation in effect in the various states.

== Acts and regulations prior to 2012 ==
Each state and territory has a principal health and safety act which sets out requirements for ensuring that workplaces are safe and healthy. These requirements spell out the general responsibilities of different groups of people who play a role in the workplace. Victoria, for example, first adopted modern occupational health and safety (OHS) legislation through the Occupational Health and Safety Act 1985 (No. 10190 (Vic)). The scheme has since been renewed through the Occupational Health and Safety Act 2004 (No. 107 of 2004 (Vic)).

Regulations were formulated under occupational health and safety statutes to set the standards to be achieved for the management of particular hazards such as noise, chemicals, machinery and manual handling. Reflecting the wave of occupational health and safety regulation reform that swept through Australia from the mid-1970s, following the British Robens Report, the Australian states and territories enacted legislation that replaced the traditional style legislation with performance-based legislation imposing broad general duties, with regulations and codes generally abandoning technical, detailed, specification standards, and instead using a mix of general duties of care, performance standards and process standards. The laws generally set out hazard identification and risk identification, assessment, and control procedures.

== WHS harmonisation ==
The process of harmonization commenced in July 2008 when the Australian Commonwealth, state and territory governments signed an intergovernmental agreement to agree to harmonise health and safety laws across Australia. That process resulted in a National review with over 232 recommendations submitted to workplace relations ministerial council members for approval. Following on from the review and recommendations being endorsed by ministers the national model Work Health and Safety Act was drafted and sent out for public comment in late 2009. Ministers endorsed that act in December 2009. Following that process was the development of the model regulations and codes of practice. Their intergovernmental agreement (IGA) requires each jurisdiction to implement the moral legislation as mirror laws in their jurisdiction by the first of January 2012. Essentially this means section 16 of the Queensland act should be the same as the section 16 of the Victorian act or in New South Wales.

Implementation dates in different territories were:

State/territory	Date implemented
Queensland	1 January 2012
New South Wales	1 January 2012
Tasmania	1 January 2013
Northern Territory	1 January 2012
Australian Capital Territory	1 January 2012
South Australia	1 January 2013
Victoria	Not implemented
Western Australia	31 March 2022

The process provides legislative clarity for all stakeholders, giving businesses a clearer understanding of health and safety law regardless of the state they operate in. Compliance costs are lower as there are fewer differing requirements, less training needs and a reduced requirement for local subject matter experts. Governments also benefit from the reduced cost of developing health and safety law.

== Codes of practice ==
The model Work Health and Safety Act and Regulation are supported by codes of practice, developed to give practical guidance on the requirements of the Workplace Health & Safety Act 2011 and Workplace Health & Safety Regulation 2011. The codes of practice are admissible in court as evidence of whether a duty has been complied with, and can also provide evidence of what is known about a particular hazard or risk in control measures and what is reasonably practicable. The codes of practice set a benchmark, and workplaces can choose to follow them or any other code that provides the same or better level of protection. For example, there is a general risk assessment code of practice, but larger organisations may choose to follow the international standard on managing risk in ISO 31000.

== See also ==
- Occupational safety and health
- WorkSafe Victoria
- Worksafe (Western Australia)
