= List of acts of the Oireachtas =

This is a list of acts of the Oireachtas for the years 1922 to present. All Acts listed are public Acts unless otherwise stated.

Prior to 2003, the short title of legislation included a comma before the year, i.e., Appropriation Act, 1922. This is omitted in accordance with the Interpretation Act 2005.

== 1922–1929 ==
=== 1922 ===
Short title, or popular name	Citation	Royal assent
Long title
Constitution of the Irish Free State (Saorstát Éireann) Act 1922	No. 1 of 1922	n/a
An Act to enact a constitution for the Irish Free State (Saorstát Éireann) and for implementing the treaty between Great Britain and Ireland signed at London on the 6th day of December, 1921. (An Act of the Irish Constituent Assembly as the Oireachtas did not yet exist. An equivalent Act of the UK Parliament was also made.)
Adaptation of Enactments Act 1922	No. 2 of 1922	20 December 1922
An Act to interpret and to adapt to the circumstances of Saorstát Éireann certain acts of the British parliament having the force of law in Saorstát Éireann and certain statutory rules orders and regulations and certain contracts.
Appropriation Act 1922	No. 3 of 1922	20 December 1922
An Act to grant and appropriate certain sums for the service of the financial year ending on the 31st day of March, 1923.
Local Elections Postponement Act 1922	No. 4 of 1922	21 December 1922
An Act to postpone the elections to certain local bodies which are due to be held in the month of January 1923 and to enable the elections to other local bodies which are due to be held in the year 1923 to be postponed and to make certain provisions consequential on such postponements.
Expiring Laws Continuance Act 1922	No. 5 of 1922	21 December 1922
An Act to continue certain expiring laws.

=== 1923 ===
Short title, or popular name	Citation	Royal assent
Long title
Comptroller and Auditor-General Act 1923	No. 1 of 1923	12 January 1923
An act to provide for the office of Comptroller and Auditor-General, and for other matters connected therewith.
Indemnity (British Military) Act 1923	No. 2 of 1923	10 February 1923
An Act to restrict the taking of legal proceedings in respect of certain acts, matters and things done in Saorstát Éireann in the recent conflict with the British government, and to provide for matters consequential thereon.
Statutory Undertakings (Continuance of Charges) Act 1923	No. 3 of 1923	16 February 1923
An Act to authorise certain statutory undertakings in Saorstát Éireann to continue temporarily the increases authorised under recent statutes in the statutory charges made by such undertakings respectively and for other purposes connected therewith.
Enforcement of Law (Occasional Powers) Act 1923	No. 4 of 1923	1 March 1923
An Act to prevent the obstruction of legal remedies, and to provide for the better enforcement of law, and for other matters connected therewith.
Griffith Settlement Act 1923	No. 5 of 1923	16 March 1923
an act to make a suitable provision for the widow, children and sister of the late president Arthur Griffith in consideration of his eminent services to the nation.
District Justices (Temporary Provisions) Act 1923	No. 6 of 1923	27 March 1923
An Act to make temporary provision for the appointment of district justices to hold courts of summary jurisdiction and to make consequential alterations in the law relating to courts of summary jurisdiction and for other purposes connected therewith.
Central Fund (No. 1) Act 1923	No. 7 of 1923	28 March 1923
An Act to apply certain sums out of the central fund to the service of the years ending on the thirty-first day of March, One Thousand Nine Hundred and Twenty-Three, and One Thousand Nine Hundred and Twenty-Four.
Double Taxation (Relief) Act 1923	No. 8 of 1923	28 March 1923
An Act to authorise the making of arrangements with the government of Great Britain for granting relief from double taxation wherever there is a charge both to an Irish Free State tax and to a corresponding British tax in respect of the same subject matter.
Local Government (Temporary Provisions) Act 1923	No. 9 of 1923	28 March 1923
An Act to remedy the more serious defects in the existing law relating to the relief of the poor and certain other matters of local government and for that purpose to amend temporarily the laws relating to the matters aforesaid.
Solicitors (Ireland) Act 1898, Amendment Act 1923	No. 10 of 1923	29 March 1923
An Act to amend the Solicitors (Ireland) Act, 1898.
Local Authorities (Extension of Time) Act 1923	No. 11 of 1923	29 March 1923
An Act to enable the times limited by Special Acts of the Parliament of the late United Kingdom for the execution of public works by local authorities to be extended and for other purposes connected therewith.
Electoral Act 1923	No. 12 of 1923	17 April 1923
An Act to regulate the Dáil and Seanad franchises in Saorstát Éireann; to amend and consolidate the law relating to the registration of electors and the conduct of elections to Dáil Éireann; and to regulate the conduct of elections to Seanad Éireann and of a referendum and for other purposes connected therewith.
Summer Time Act 1923	No. 13 of 1923	19 April 1923
An Act to provide for the time in Saorstát Éireann being in advance of West-European time during a certain period of the year.
Governor-General's Salary and Establishment Act 1923	No. 14 of 1923	10 May 1923
An Act to make provision for the payment of the salary of the Governor-General of the Irish Free State and for the maintenance of his official residence and establishment in accordance with the constitution of Saorstát Éireann.
Damage To Property (Compensation) Act 1923	No. 15 of 1923	12 May 1923
An Act to alter the law relating to compensation for criminal injuries.
Statutory Undertakings (Continuance of Charges) (No. 2) Act 1923	No. 16 of 1923	31 May 1923
An Act to authorise certain statutory undertakings in Saorstát Éireann to continue temporarily after the expiration of the Statutory Undertakings (Continuance of Charges) Act 1923, certain increases in the statutory charges made by such undertakings and for other purposes connected therewith.
Unemployment Insurance Act 1923	No. 17 of 1923	11 June 1923
An Act to amend the Unemployment Insurance Acts, 1920 to 1922.
The Oireachtas (Payment of Members) Act 1923	No. 18 of 1923	18 June 1923
An Act to provide for the payment of allowances to members of the Oireachtas and to authorise the provision of certain free travelling facilities for such members.
Increase of Rent and Mortgage Interest (Restrictions) Act 1923	No. 19 of 1923	22 June 1923
An Act to amend and continue certain existing restrictions with respect to the increase of rent and recovery of possession of premises, in certain cases, and the increase of the rate of interest on, and the calling in of, securities on such premises, and for purposes in connection therewith.
National Health Insurance Act 1923	No. 20 of 1923	26 June 1923
An Act to amend and adapt the National Health Insurance Acts, 1911 to 1921.
Finance Act 1923	No. 21 of 1923	9 July 1923
An Act to charge and impose certain duties of customs and inland revenue, including excise, to amend the law relating to customs and inland revenue, including excise, and to make further provisions in connection with finance.
Rathdown No. 1 Waterworks Provisional Order (Confirmation) Act 1923	No. 22 of 1923	16 July 1923
An Act to confirm the Rathdown No. 1 waterworks provisional order.
Censorship of Films Act 1923	No. 23 of 1923	16 July 1923
An Act to provide for the official censoring of cinematograph pictures and for other matters connected therewith.
Civic Guard (Acquisition of Premises) Act 1923	No. 24 of 1923	16 July 1923
An act to authorise the compulsory acquisition of premises for the accommodation of members of the Civic Guard and for other purposes connected therewith.
Land Trust Powers Act 1923	No. 25 of 1923	16 July 1923
An Act to enable the Irish Sailors and Soldiers land trust to exercise certain powers in Saorstát Éireann and for other purposes in connection with the said trust.
Army Pensions Act 1923	No. 26 of 1923	24 July 1923
An Act to provide for the payment of wound pensions to wounded members of Óglaigh na hÉireann, including the army and the Irish Volunteers and also of the Irish Citizen Army, 1916, and for the payment of allowances and gratuities to the widows, children and dependants of deceased members of Óglaigh na hÉireann, including the army and the Irish Volunteers, and also of the Irish Citizen Army, 1916, and for other purposes connected therewith.
Land Law (Commission) Act 1923	No. 27 of 1923	24 July 1923
An Act to amend the law relating to the Irish Land Commission and to dissolve the Congested Districts Board for Ireland and transfer its functions to the Irish Land Commission, and for other purposes connected therewith.
Public Safety (Emergency Powers) Act 1923	No. 28 of 1923	1 August 1923
An Act to provide for the preservation of public safety and the protection of person and property and for matters connected therewith or arising out of the present emergency.
Public Safety (Emergency Powers) (No. 2) Act 1923	No. 29 of 1923	3 August 1923
An Act to make provision for the immediate preservation of the public safety.
Defence Forces (Temporary Provisions) Act 1923	No. 30 of 1923	3 August 1923
An Act to make temporary provisions in relation to the defence of Saorstát Éireann and other matters incidental thereto.
Indemnity Act 1923	No. 31 of 1923	3 August 1923
An Act to restrict the taking of legal proceedings in respect of certain acts and matters done during the suppression of the state of armed rebellion created by the attempt to overthrow by force the lawfully established government of Saorstát Éireann, and to validate sentences imposed by military tribunals established in the course of the suppression of the state of armed rebellion aforesaid, and to provide for the review of such sentences, and for other purposes connected therewith.
Finance (No. 2) Act 1923	No. 32 of 1923	8 August 1923
An Act to give relief from income tax for the year 1923-24 in the case of national health insurance authorities in Great Britain and Northern Ireland.
Appropriation Act 1923	No. 33 of 1923	8 August 1923
An Act to apply a sum out of the central fund to the service of the year ending on the thirty-first day of March, One Thousand Nine Hundred and Twenty-Four, and to appropriate the further supplies granted in this session of the Oireachtas.
Superannuation and Pensions Act 1923	No. 34 of 1923	8 August 1923
An Act to make provision for the superannuation of, and payment of pensions, allowances, and gratuities to or in respect of, certain persons in the service of Saorstát Éireann, and to authorise the payment of pensions, allowances, and gratuities to certain former members of the Royal Irish Constabulary and to amend and extend the law relating to superannuation and the payment of pensions in Saorstát Éireann.
Civil Service Regulation Act 1923	No. 35 of 1923	8 August 1923
An Act to regulate the appointment and service of persons in the civil service of the government of Saorstát Éireann and to establish a body of commissioners to inquire into and certify the qualifications of persons proposed to be appointed, and for other purposes connected therewith.
Dáil Éireann Courts (Winding-Up) Act 1923	No. 36 of 1923	8 August 1923
An Act to provide for the appointment of commissioners to dispose of cases which were pending in courts established under the authority of Dáil Éireann, to establish a register of decrees of such courts and to make other provisions for the purposes of winding-up the courts aforesaid, and relieving certain hardships and anomalies which have arisen in connection with those courts.
Garda Síochána (Temporary Provisions) Act 1923	No. 37 of 1923	8 August 1923
An Act to establish in Saorstát Éireann and regulate a police force to be called the Garda Síochána.
The Prevention of Electoral Abuses Act 1923	No. 38 of 1923	8 August 1923
An Act to amend and consolidate the law relating to the prevention of corrupt and illegal practices and other electoral abuses at elections to Dáil Éireann, and to make provision for the prevention of such practices and abuses at elections to Seanad Éireann and at a referendum, and for other purposes connected therewith.
Dyestuffs (Import Regulation) Repeal Act 1923	No. 39 of 1923	8 August 1923
An Act to repeal the act of the parliament of the late United Kingdom of Great Britain and Ireland entitled the Dyestuffs (Import Regulation) Act, 1920, if and so far as the same is in force in Saorstát Éireann.
Valuation (Postponement of Revision) Act 1923	No. 40 of 1923	8 August 1923
An Act to authorise the postponement for one year of the making of the annual revision of valuation of lands, tenements and hereditaments.
League of Nations (Guarantee) Act 1923	No. 41 of 1923	8 August 1923
An Act to authorise the executive council in the name and on behalf of Saorstát Éireann to give certain guarantees to the League of Nations and to accept certain regulations prescribed by that league.
Land Act 1923	No. 42 of 1923	9 August 1923
An Act to amend the law relating to the occupation and ownership of land and for other purposes relating thereto.
Damage To Property (Amendment) Act 1923	No. 43 of 1923	9 August 1923
An Act to amend and extend the Damage to Property (Compensation) Act, 1923.
Licensing (Renewal of Licences) Act 1923	No. 44 of 1923	31 October 1923
An Act to validate certain licences for the sale of intoxicating liquors which have lapsed by non-renewal, and to give effect to certain transfers of such licences.
County Courts (Amendment) Act 1923	No. 45 of 1923	31 October 1923
An Act to remove certain difficulties in relation to the holding of quarter sessions and civil bill courts and the return of jurors and the service of documents in relation to such courts.
Interpretation Act 1923	No. 46 of 1923	28 December 1923
An Act to prescribe rules for the construction of acts of the Oireachtas, and to define the meaning of certain words and expressions commonly used in such acts, and for other purposes relating to the meaning, construction, and operation of acts of the Oireachtas and of instruments made under the authority thereof.
Expiring Laws Act 1923	No. 47 of 1923	28 December 1923
An Act to make permanent certain expiring acts and to continue for a limited period certain other expiring acts.
Local Elections Postponement (Amendment) Act 1923	No. 48 of 1923	28 December 1923
An Act to amend the Local Elections Postponement Act, 1922.
Local Authorities (Indemnity) Act 1923	No. 49 of 1923	28 December 1823
An Act to establish the validity of certain acts done and omissions made by local authorities during the period between the 31st day of March, 1920, and the 6th day of December, 1922.
Gaming Act 1923	No. 50 of 1923	28 December 1923
An Act to repeal section 2 of the Gaming Act, 1835, and for other purposes relating to such repeal.

=== 1924 ===
- No. 1/1924 – Public Safety (Powers of Arrest and Detention) Temporary Act 1924
- No. 2/1924 – Court Officers (Temporary Appointments) Act 1924
- No. 3/1924 – Dáil Éireann Loans and Funds Act 1924
- No. 4/1924 – Coroners (Qualification) Act 1924
- No. 5/1924 – Civil Service Regulation Act 1924
- No. 6/1924 – Fisheries Act 1924
- No. 7/1924 – Local Government Electors Registration Act 1924
- No. 8/1924 – Central Fund Act 1924
- No. 9/1924 – Firearms (Temporary Provisions) Act 1924
- No. 10/1924 – Courts of Justice Act 1924
- No. 11/1924 – Local Government (Collection of Rates) Act 1924
- No. 12/1924 – Summer Time Act 1924
- No. 13/1924 – Local Government (Temporary Provisions) (Amendment) Act 1924
- No. 14/1924 – Housing (Building Facilities) Act 1924
- No. 15/1924 – Public Safety (Punishment of Offences) Temporary Act 1924
- No. 16/1924 – Ministers and Secretaries Act 1924
- No. 17/1924 – Electricity Undertakings (Continuance of Charges) Act 1924
- No. 18/1924 – Juries (Amendment) Act 1924
- No. 19/1924 – Old Age Pension Act 1924
- No. 20/1924 – Enforcement of Law (Occasional Powers) Act 1924
- No. 21/1924 – Companies (Re-Constitution of Records) Act 1924
- No. 22/1924 – Road Fund (Advances) Act 1924
- No. 23/1924 – Civic Guard (Acquisition of Premises) (Amendment) Act 1924
- No. 24/1924 – Dublin Reconstruction (Emergency Provisions) Act 1924
- No. 25/1924 – The Garda Síochána Act 1924
- No. 26/1924 – Unemployment Insurance Act 1924
- No. 27/1924 – Finance Act 1924
- No. 28/1924 – Intoxicating Liquor Act 1924
- No. 29/1924 – Railways Act 1924
- No. 30/1924 – National Health Insurance Act 1924
- No. 31/1924 – Dublin Police Act 1924
- No. 32/1924 – Dáil Éireann Courts (Winding Up) Act 1923, Amendment Act 1924
- No. 33/1924 – Telephone Capital Act 1924
- No. 34/1924 – Appropriation Act 1924
- No. 35/1924 – Agricultural Produce (Eggs) Act 1924
- No. 36/1924 – Local Government (Rates on Agricultural Land) Act 1924
- No. 37/1924 – Criminal Justice (Evidence) Act 1924
- No. 38/1924 – Defence Forces (Temporary Provisions) Act 1923 (Continuance and Amendment) Act 1924
- No. 39/1924 – Local Elections Postponement (Amendment) Act 1924
- No. 40/1924 – Indemnity Act 1924
- No. 41/1924 – Trade Loans (Guarantee) Act 1924
- No. 42/1924 – Damage To Property (Compensation) (Amendment) Act 1924
- No. 43/1924 – Fisheries (Election of Conservators Postponement) Act 1924
- No. 44/1924 – Criminal Justice (Administration) Act 1924
- No. 45/1924 – State Lands Act 1924
- No. 46/1924 – Drainage Maintenance Act 1924
- No. 47/1924 – Intermediate Education (Amendment) Act 1924
- No. 48/1924 – Military Service Pensions Act 1924
- No. 49/1924 – State Harbours Act 1924
- No. 50/1924 – Local Officers' Compensation (War Period) Act 1924
- No. 51/1924 – Treaty (Confirmation of Supplemental Agreement) Act 1924
- No. 52/1924 – Private Bill Costs Act 1924
- No. 53/1924 – Oireachtas Witnesses Oaths Act 1924
- No. 54/1924 – Housing (Building Facilities) (Amendment) Act 1924
- No. 55/1924 – Seed Supply Act 1924
- No. 56/1924 – Public Holidays Act 1924
- No. 57/1924 – County Court Appeals Act 1924
- No. 58/1924 – Dairy Produce Act 1924
- No. 59/1924 – Unemployment Insurance (No. 2) Act 1924
- No. 60/1924 – Expiring Laws Act 1924
- No. 61/1924 – Railways (Directorate) Act 1924
- No. 62/1924 – Intoxicating Liquor (General) Act 1924

Private Acts

- No. 1/1924 – The Sligo Lighting and Electric Power Act 1924
- No. 2/1924 – Pilotage Orders Confirmation Act 1924

=== 1925 ===
- No. 1/1925 – Dublin Port and Docks Act 1925
- No. 2/1925 – Medical Act 1925
- No. 3/1925 – Live Stock Breeding Act 1925
- No. 4/1925 – Defence Forces (Temporary Provisions) Act 1925
- No. 5/1925 – Local Government Act 1925
- No. 6/1925 – Central Fund Act 1925
- No. 7/1925 – Police Forces Amalgamation Act 1925
- No. 8/1925 – Summer Time Act 1925
- No. 9/1925 – Dáil Éireann Courts (Winding-Up) Act 1925
- No. 10/1925 – Firearms (Temporary Provisions) (Continuance) Act 1925
- No. 11/1925 – Prisons (Visiting Committees) Act 1925
- No. 12/1925 – Housing Act 1925
- No. 13/1925 – Dáil Supreme Court (Pensions) Act 1925
- No. 14/1925 – Civic Guard (Acquisition of Premises) (Amendment) Act 1925
- No. 15/1925 – Military Service Pensions Act 1925
- No. 16/1925 – Enforcement of Law (Occasional Powers) (Continuance) Act 1925
- No. 17/1925 – Firearms Act 1925
- No. 18/1925 – Treasonable Offences Act 1925
- No. 19/1925 – Trade Loans (Guarantee) (Amendment) Act 1925
- No. 20/1925 – Local Authorities (Combined Purchasing) Act 1925
- No. 21/1925 – Censorship of Films (Amendment) Act 1925
- No. 22/1925 – Acquisition of Land (Reference Committee) Act 1925
- No. 23/1925 – Superannuation and Pensions (Amendment) Act 1925
- No. 24/1925 – Documentary Evidence Act 1925
- No. 25/1925 – Land Bond Act 1925
- No. 26/1925 – Shannon Electricity Act 1925
- No. 27/1925 – Appropriation Act 1925
- No. 28/1925 – Finance Act 1925
- No. 29/1925 – Oireachtas (Payment of Members) (Amendment) Act 1925
- No. 30/1925 – Constitution (Amendment No. 1) Act 1925
- No. 31/1925 – Phoenix Park Act 1925
- No. 32/1925 – Fisheries Act 1925
- No. 33/1925 – Arterial Drainage Act 1925
- No. 34/1925 – Electoral (Seanad Elections) Act 1925
- No. 35/1925 – Local Government (Rates on Agricultural Land) Act 1925
- No. 36/1925 – National Health Insurance Act 1925
- No. 37/1925 – Beet Sugar (Subsidy) Act 1925
- No. 38/1925 – Dublin Reconstruction (Emergency Provisions) (Amendment) Act 1925
- No. 39/1925 – Shop Hours (Drapery Trades, Dublin and Districts) Act 1925
- No. 40/1925 – Treaty (Confirmation of Amending Agreement) Act 1925
- No. 41/1925 – Expiring Laws Act 1925
- No. 42/1925 – Local Elections Postponement Act 1925

Private Acts

- No. 1/1925 — Dublin United Tramways (Omnibus Services) Act 1925
- No. 2/1925 — Department of Local Government and Public Health Provisional Order Confirmation No. 1 Act 1925
- No. 3/1925 — Dundalk Harbour and Port Act 1925

=== 1926 ===
- No. 1/1926 – Courts of Justice Act 1926
- No. 2/1926 – Electricity Supply (Special Powers) Act 1926
- No. 3/1926 – River Owenmore Drainage Act 1926
- No. 4/1926 – Medical Act 1926
- No. 5/1926 – Oil in Navigable Waters Act 1926
- No. 6/1926 – Adaptation of Charters Act 1926
- No. 7/1926 – Industrial Trust Company of Ireland Limited (Acquisition of Capital) Act 1926
- No. 8/1926 – Acquisition of Land (Allotments) Act 1926
- No. 9/1926 – Defence Forces (Temporary Provisions) Act 1926
- No. 10/1926 – Police Forces Amalgamation (Amendment) Act 1926
- No. 11/1926 – Land Act 1926
- No. 12/1926 – Statistics Act 1926
- No. 13/1926 – Central Fund Act 1926
- No. 14/1926 – Coinage Act 1926
- No. 15/1926 – Street Trading Act 1926
- No. 16/1926 – The Protection of the Community (Special Powers) Act 1926
- No. 17/1926 – School Attendance Act 1926
- No. 18/1926 – Enforcement of Court Orders Act 1926
- No. 19/1926 – Damage To Property (Compensation) (Amendment) Act 1926
- No. 20/1926 – Civic Guard (Acquisition of Premises) (Amendment) Act 1926
- No. 21/1926 – Unemployment Insurance Act 1926
- No. 22/1926 – Local Elections (Dissolved Authorities) Act 1926
- No. 23/1926 – Deputy Registrar in Bankruptcy (Cork) Act 1926
- No. 24/1926 – Increase of Rent and Mortgage Interest (Restrictions) Act 1926
- No. 25/1926 – Railways (Existing Officers and Servants) Act 1926
- No. 26/1926 – Immature Spirits (Restriction) Act 1926
- No. 27/1926 – Court Officers Act 1926
- No. 28/1926 – Appropriation Act 1926
- No. 29/1926 – Road Fund (Advances) Act 1926
- No. 30/1926 – Local Government (Collection of Rates) Act 1926
- No. 31/1926 – Housing Act 1926
- No. 32/1926 – University Education (Agriculture and Dairy Science) Act 1926
- No. 33/1926 – Trade Loans (Guarantee) (Amendment) Act 1926
- No. 34/1926 – Local Authorities (Mutual Assurance) Act 1926
- No. 35/1926 – Finance Act 1926
- No. 36/1926 – Shop Hours (Drapery Trades, Dublin and Districts) Act 1926
- No. 37/1926 – Juries (Dublin) Act 1926
- No. 38/1926 – Betting Act 1926
- No. 39/1926 – Local Authorities (Officers and Employees) Act 1926
- No. 40/1926 – Tariff Commission Act 1926
- No. 41/1926 – Civil Service Regulation (Amendment) Act 1926
- No. 42/1926 – Public Safety (Emergency Powers) Act 1926
- No. 43/1926 – Expiring Laws Act 1926
- No. 44/1926 – National Health Insurance Act 1926
- No. 45/1926 – Wireless Telegraphy Act 1926

Private Acts

- No. 1/1926 – Pilotage Order Confirmation Act 1926
- No. 2/1926 – Limerick Harbour Act 1926

=== 1927 ===
- No. 1/1927 – Coroners (Amendment) Act 1927
- No. 2/1927 – Medical Act 1927
- No. 3/1927 – Local Government Act 1927
- No. 4/1927 – Constitution (Amendment No. 3) Act 1927
- No. 5/1927 – Constitution (Amendment No. 4) Act 1927
- No. 6/1927 – Constitution (Amendment No. 2) Act 1927
- No. 7/1927 – Provisional Collection of Taxes Act 1927
- No. 8/1927 – Telephone Capital Act 1927
- No. 9/1927 – Defence Forces (Temporary Provisions) Act 1927
- No. 10/1927 – Circuit Court Appeals Act 1927
- No. 11/1927 – Central Fund Act 1927
- No. 12/1927 – Army Pensions Act 1927
- No. 13/1927 – Constitution (Amendment No. 5) Act 1927
- No. 14/1927 – Local Elections (Dissolved Authorities) Act 1927
- No. 15/1927 – Intoxicating Liquor Act 1927
- No. 16/1927 – Industrial and Commercial Property (Protection) Act 1927
- No. 17/1927 – Railways (Road Motor Services) Act 1927
- No. 18/1927 – Finance Act 1927
- No. 19/1927 – Land Act 1927
- No. 20/1927 – Appropriation Act 1927
- No. 21/1927 – Electoral (Amendment) Act 1927
- No. 22/1927 – Civic Guard (Acquisition of Premises) (Amendment) Act 1927
- No. 23/1927 – Juries Act 1927
- No. 24/1927 – Agricultural Credit Act 1927
- No. 25/1927 – Medical Practitioners Act 1927
- No. 26/1927 – Barrow Drainage Act 1927
- No. 27/1927 – Electricity (Supply) Act 1927
- No. 28/1927 – Appropriation (No 2) Act 1927
- No. 29/1927 – Courts of Justice Act 1927
- No. 30/1927 – Trade Loans (Guarantee) (Amendment) Act 1927
- No. 31/1927 – Public Safety Act 1927
- No. 32/1927 – Currency Act 1927
- No. 33/1927 – Electoral (Amendment) (No. 2) Act 1927
- No. 34/1927 – County Court Appeals Act 1927
- No. 35/1927 – Dairy Produce (Amendment) Act 1927
- No. 36/1927 – Expiring Laws Act 1927
- No. 37/1927 – National Health Insurance Act 1927
- No. 38/1927 – Finance (No. 2) Act 1927
- No. 39/1927 – Local Elections Act 1927
- No. 40/1927 – Defence Forces (Temporary Provisions) (No. 2) Act 1927

Private Acts

- No. 1/1927 – Pilotage Order Confirmation Act 1927
- No. 2/1927 – Dublin United Tramways (Lucan Electric Railways) Act 1927

=== 1928 ===
- No. 1/1928 – Old Age Pensions Act 1928
- No. 2/1928 – Central Fund Act 1928
- No. 3/1928 – Weights and Measures Act 1928
- No. 4/1928 – Local Government (Rates on Small Dwellings) Act 1928
- No. 5/1928 – Increase of Rent and Mortgage Interest (Restrictions) Act 1928
- No. 6/1928 – Ministers and Secretaries (Amendment) Act 1928
- No. 7/1928 – Civic Guard (Acquisition of Premises) (Amendment) Act 1928
- No. 8/1928 – Constitution (Amendment No. 10) Act 1928
- No. 9/1928 – Bodies Corporate (Executors and Administrators) Act 1928
- No. 10/1928 – Telegraph Act 1928
- No. 11/1928 – Finance Act 1928
- No. 12/1928 – Slaughtered Animals (Compensation) Act 1928
- No. 13/1928 – Constitution (Amendment No. 6) Act 1928
- No. 14/1928 – Constitution (Amendment No. 13) Act 1928
- No. 15/1928 – Courts of Justice Act 1928
- No. 16/1928 – Central Fund (No. 2) Act 1928
- No. 17/1928 – Oireachtas (Payment of Members) Act 1928
- No. 18/1928 – Betting Act 1928
- No. 19/1928 – Trade Loans (Guarantee) (Amendment) Act 1928
- No. 20/1928 – National Gallery of Ireland Act 1928
- No. 21/1928 – Local Authorities (Mutual Assurance) Act 1928
- No. 22/1928 – Agricultural Credit Act 1928
- No. 23/1928 – Arterial Drainage (Minor Schemes) Act 1928
- No. 24/1928 – Gas Regulation Act 1928
- No. 25/1928 – Dentists Act 1928
- No. 26/1928 – Creamery Act 1928
- No. 27/1928 – Constitution (Amendment No. 8) Act 1928
- No. 28/1928 – Constitution (Amendment No. 9) Act 1928
- No. 29/1928 – Seanad Electoral Act 1928
- No. 30/1928 – Constitution (Amendment No. 7) Act 1928
- No. 31/1928 – Housing Act 1928
- No. 32/1928 – Teachers Superannuation Act 1928
- No. 33/1928 – Appropriation Act 1928
- No. 34/1928 – Forestry Act 1928
- No. 35/1928 – Courts of Justice (No, 2) Act 1928
- No. 36/1928 – Expiring Laws Act 1928
- No. 37/1928 – National Health Insurance Act 1928
- No. 38/1928 – Public Safety Act 1928

Private Acts

- No. 1/1928 – Pilotage Order Confirmation Act 1928
- No. 2/1928 – The Methodist Church in Ireland Act 1928
- No. 3/1928 – Local Government and Public Health Provisional Order Confirmation Act 1928

=== 1929 ===
- No. 1/1929 – Cork City Management Act 1929
- No. 2/1929 – Defence Forces (Temporary Provisions) Act 1929
- No. 3/1929 – Local Elections (Dublin) Act 1929
- No. 4/1929 – Central Fund Act 1929
- No. 5/1929 – Finance (Customs and Stamp Duties) Act 1929
- No. 6/1929 – Ennis Urban District Council (Dissolution) Act 1929
- No. 7/1929 – Destructive Insects and Pests Act 1929
- No. 8/1929 – Constitution (Amendment No. 14) Act 1929
- No. 9/1929 – Constitution (Amendment No. 15) Act 1929
- No. 10/1929 – Constitution (Amendment No. 16) Act 1929
- No. 11/1929 – Superannuation and Pensions Act 1929
- No. 12/1929 – Housing Act 1929
- No. 13/1929 – Industrial and Commercial Property (Protection) (Amendment) Act 1929
- No. 14/1929 – Intoxicating Liquor (Amendment) Act 1929
- No. 15/1929 – Increase of Rent and Mortgage Interest (Restrictions) Act 1929
- No. 16/1929 – Legal Practitioners (Qualification) Act 1929
- No. 17/1929 – Betting Act 1929
- No. 18/1929 – Arterial Drainage (Amendment) Act 1929
- No. 19/1929 – Civic Guard (Acquisition of Premises) (Amendment) Act 1929
- No. 20/1929 – Intoxicating Liquor (Amendment) (No. 2) Act 1929
- No. 21/1929 – Censorship of Publications Act 1929
- No. 22/1929 – Totalisator Act 1929
- No. 23/1929 – Railways (Amendment) Act 1929
- No. 24/1929 – Children Act 1929
- No. 25/1929 – Copyright (Preservation) Act 1929
- No. 26/1929 – Electricity (Finance) Act 1929
- No. 27/1929 – Trade Loans (Guarantee) (Amendment) Act 1929
- No. 28/1929 – Trim Urban District Council (Dissolution) Act 1929
- No. 29/1929 – Appropriation Act 1929
- No. 30/1929 – Agricultural Credit Act 1929
- No. 31/1929 – Land Act 1929
- No. 32/1929 – Finance Act 1929
- No. 33/1929 – Juries (Protection) Act 1929
- No. 34/1929 – Constitution (Amendment No. 11) Act 1929
- No. 35/1929 – University College Galway Act 1929
- No. 36/1929 – Civil Service (Transferred Officers) Compensation Act 1929
- No. 37/1929 – Courts of Justice Act 1929
- No. 38/1929 – Expiring Laws Act 1929
- No. 39/1929 – Electricity Agreements (Adaptation) Act 1929
- No. 40/1929 – Poor Relief (Dublin) Act 1929
- No. 41/1929 – An tAcht na dTithe (Gaeltacht) 1929
- No. 41/1929 – Housing (Gaeltacht) Act 1929
- No. 42/1929 – National Health Insurance Act 1929

Private Acts

- No. 1/1929 – Limerick Corporation Gas Undertaking (Pensions) Act 1929
- No. 2/1929 – Dublin Port and Docks (Bridges) Act 1929
- No. 3/1929 – Pier and Harbour Provisional Order Confirmation Act 1929
- No. 4/1929 – Bank of Ireland Act 1929

== 1930–1939 ==
=== 1930 ===
- No. 1/1930 – Seanad Bye-Elections Act 1930
- No. 2/1930 – National Monuments Act 1930
- No. 3/1930 – University Education (Agriculture and Dairy Science) Act 1930
- No. 4/1930 – Finance (New Customs Duties) Act 1930
- No. 5/1930 – Constitution (Amendment No. 12) Act 1930
- No. 6/1930 – Defence Forces (Temporary Provisions) Act 1930
- No. 7/1930 – Central Fund Act 1930
- No. 8/1930 – Military Service Pensions Act 1930
- No. 9/1930 – State Lands (Workhouses) Act 1930
- No. 10/1930 – Agricultural Produce (Fresh Meat) Act 1930
- No. 11/1930 – Game Preservation Act 1930
- No. 12/1930 – Public Charitable Hospitals (Temporary Provisions) Act 1930
- No. 13/1930 – Censorship of Films (Amendment) Act 1930
- No. 14/1930 – Civil Service (Transferred Officers) Compensation (Amendment) Act 1930
- No. 15/1930 – Civic Guard (Acquisition of Premises) (Amendment) Act 1930
- No. 16/1930 – Wild Birds Protection Act 1930
- No. 17/1930 – Illegitimate Children (Affiliation Orders) Act 1930
- No. 18/1930 – Increase of Rent and Mortgage Interest (Restrictions) Act 1930
- No. 19/1930 – Electricity (Supply) (Amendment) Act 1930
- No. 20/1930 – Finance Act 1930
- No. 21/1930 – Appropriation Act 1930
- No. 22/1930 – Housing Act 1930
- No. 23/1930 – School Meals (Gaeltacht) Act 1930
- No. 24/1930 – Trade Loans (Guarantee) (Amendment) Act 1930
- No. 25/1930 – Labourers Act 1930
- No. 26/1930 – Local Government (Amendment) Act 1930
- No. 27/1930 – Local Government (Dublin) Act 1930
- No. 28/1930 – Electoral (Dublin Commercial) Act 1930
- No. 29/1930 – Vocational Education Act 1930
- No. 30/1930 – Currency (Amendment) Act 1930
- No. 31/1930 – Tariff Commission (Amendment) Act 1930
- No. 32/1930 – Expiring Laws Act 1930
- No. 33/1930 – Unemployment Insurance Act 1930
- No. 34/1930 – Education (Provision of Meals) (Amendment) Act 1930
- No. 35/1930 – Portuguese Treaty Act 1930
- No. 36/1930 – Agricultural Produce (Eggs) Act 1930

Private Acts

- No. 1/1930 – Waterford and Bishop Foy Endowed Schools (Amendment) Act 1930
- No. 2/1930 – Pier and Harbour Provisional Order Confirmation Act 1930

=== 1931 ===
- No. 1/1931 – Courts of Justice Act 1931
- No. 2/1931 – Defence Forces (Temporary Provisions) Act 1931
- No. 3/1931 – Public Health (Special Expenses) Act 1931
- No. 4/1931 – Sea Fisheries Act 1931
- No. 5/1931 – Central Fund Act 1931
- No. 6/1931 – Aliens Restriction (Amendment) Act 1931
- No. 7/1931 – Poor Relief (Dublin) Act 1931
- No. 8/1931 – Agriculture Act 1931
- No. 9/1931 – Commissioners For Oaths (Diplomatic and Consular) Act 1931
- No. 10/1931 – Plate Assay (Amendment) Act 1931
- No. 11/1931 – Land Act 1931
- No. 12/1931 – Telephone Capital Act 1931
- No. 13/1931 – Legitimacy Act 1931
- No. 14/1931 – Finance (Customs Duties) Act 1931
- No. 15/1931 – Tourist Traffic (Development) Act 1931
- No. 16/1931 – Civic Guard (Acquisition of Premises) (Amendment) Act 1931
- No. 17/1931 – Local Elections and Meetings (Postponement) Act 1931
- No. 18/1931 – Juries (Protection) Act 1931
- No. 19/1931 – Local Government Act 1931
- No. 20/1931 – Trustee Act 1931
- No. 21/1931 – Trade Loans (Guarantee) (Amendment) Act 1931
- No. 22/1931 – Pharmacopoeia Act 1931
- No. 23/1931 – Railway Fires (Amendment) Act 1931
- No. 24/1931 – Public Charitable Hospitals (Amendment) Act 1931
- No. 25/1931 – Local Government (Dublin) (Amendment) Act 1931
- No. 26/1931 – Agricultural Produce (Potatoes) Act 1931
- No. 27/1931 – Betting Act 1931
- No. 28/1931 – Local Government (Rates on Agricultural Land) Act 1931
- No. 29/1931 – Dairy Produce Act 1931
- No. 30/1931 – Appropriation Act 1931
- No. 31/1931 – Finance Act 1931
- No. 32/1931 – Electricity (Supply) (Amendment) Act 1931
- No. 33/1931 – Fisheries (Revision of Loans) Act 1931
- No. 34/1931 – Adaptation of Enactments Act 1931
- No. 35/1931 – Midwives Act 1931
- No. 36/1931 – Veterinary Surgeons Act 1931
- No. 37/1931 – Constitution (Amendment No. 17) Act 1931
- No. 38/1931 – Customs Duties (Provisional Imposition) Act 1931
- No. 39/1931 – Finance (Customs Duties) (No. 2) Act 1931
- No. 40/1931 – Courts of Justice (No. 2) Act 1931
- No. 41/1931 – Finance (Increase of Income Tax) Act 1931
- No. 42/1931 – Finance (Customs Duties) (No. 3) Act 1931
- No. 43/1931 – Finance (Customs Duties) (No. 4) Act 1931
- No. 44/1931 – Expiring Laws Act 1931
- No. 45/1931 – Agricultural Produce (Fresh Meat) Act 1931
- No. 46/1931 – Unemployment Relief Act 1931
- No. 47/1931 – Railways (Valuation For Rating) Act 1931
- No. 48/1931 – Merchandise Marks Act 1931
- No. 49/1931 – Public Charitable Hospitals (Amendment) (No. 2) Act 1931
- No. 50/1931 – Housing (Miscellaneous Provisions) Act 1931
- No. 51/1931 – Public Charitable Hospitals (Amendment) (No. 3) Act 1931
- No. 52/1931 – Defence Forces (Temporary Provisions) (No. 2) Act 1931
- No. 53/1931 – Housing (Gaeltacht) (Amendment) Act 1931
- No. 54/1931 – Mines and Minerals Act 1931
- No. 55/1931 – Landlord and Tenant Act 1931
- No. 56/1931 – Apprenticeship Act 1931

Private Acts

- No. 1/1931 – Limerick Harbour Tramways Act 1931

=== 1932 ===
- No. 1/1932 – Pension Books (Prohibition of Alienation) Act 1932
- No. 2/1932 – Road Transport Act 1932
- No. 3/1932 – Railways (Miscellaneous) Act 1932
- No. 4/1932 – Central Fund Act 1932
- No. 5/1932 – Finance (Customs Duties) Act 1932
- No. 6/1932 – Intoxicating Liquor (Occasional Licences) Act 1932
- No. 7/1932 – Eucharistic Congress (Miscellaneous Provisions) Act 1932
- No. 8/1932 – Public Charitable Hospitals Amendment Act 1932
- No. 9/1932 – Detained Animals (Compensation) Act 1932
- No. 10/1932 – Dairy Produce (Price Stabilisation) Act 1932
- No. 11/1932 – Finance (Customs Duties) (No. 2) Act 1932
- No. 12/1932 – Trade Loans (Guarantee) (Amendment) Act 1932
- No. 13/1932 – Dublin and Blessington Steam Tramway (Abandonment) Act 1932
- No. 14/1932 – Diseases of Animals Act 1932
- No. 15/1932 – Electricity (Supply) (Amendment) Act 1932
- No. 16/1932 – Emergency Imposition of Duties Act 1932
- No. 17/1932 – Central Fund (No. 2) Act 1932
- No. 18/1932 – Old Age Pensions Act 1932
- No. 19/1932 – Housing (Financial and Miscellaneous Provisions) Act 1932
- No. 20/1932 – Finance Act 1932
- No. 21/1932 – Control of Manufactures Act 1932
- No. 22/1932 – Finance (Customs Duties) (No. 3) Act 1932
- No. 23/1932 – Appropriation Act 1932
- No. 24/1932 – Army Pensions Act 1932
- No. 25/1932 – Therapeutic Substances Act 1932
- No. 26/1932 – Defence Forces (Pensions) Act 1932
- No. 27/1932 – Expiring Laws Act 1932
- No. 28/1932 – Rates on Agricultural Land (Relief) Act 1932
- No. 29/1932 – Electoral (Registration Appeals) Act 1932
- No. 30/1932 – Seeds and Fertilisers Supply Act 1932
- No. 31/1932 – Bourn Vincent Memorial Park Act 1932
- No. 32/1932 – Merchant Shipping (Helm Orders) Act 1932
- No. 33/1932 – Control of Prices Act 1932
- No. 34/1932 – Finance (Customs Duties) (No. 4) Act 1932

Private Acts

- No. 1/1932 – Pier and Harbour Provisional Order Confirmation Act 1932
- No. 2/1932 – Pier and Harbour Provisional Order Confirmation (No. 2) Act 1932
- No. 3/1932 – Pilotage Byelaw Confirmation Act 1932

=== 1933 ===
- No. 1/1933 – Central Fund Act 1933
- No. 2/1933 – Land (Purchase Annuities Fund) Act 1933
- No. 3/1933 – Defence Forces (Temporary Provisions) Act 1933
- No. 4/1933 – Dairy Produce (Price Stabilisation) Act 1933
- No. 5/1933 – Local Government Act 1933
- No. 6/1933 – Constitution (Removal of Oath) Act 1933
- No. 7/1933 – Agricultural Produce (Cereals) Act 1933
- No. 8/1933 – Road Transport Act 1933
- No. 9/1933 – Railways Act 1933
- No. 10/1933 – Trade Loans (Guarantee) (Amendment) Act 1933
- No. 11/1933 – Road Traffic Act 1933
- No. 12/1933 – Foreshore Act 1933
- No. 13/1933 – National Health Insurance Act 1933
- No. 14/1933 – Electoral (Amendment) Act 1933
- No. 15/1933 – Finance Act 1933
- No. 16/1933 – Musk Rats Act 1933
- No. 17/1933 – Cement Act 1933
- No. 18/1933 – Public Hospitals Act 1933
- No. 19/1933 – Dáil Éireann Loans and Funds (Amendment) Act 1933
- No. 20/1933 – Appropriation Act 1933
- No. 21/1933 – Imposition of Duties (Confirmation of Orders) Act 1933
- No. 22/1933 – Perpetual Funds (Registration) Act 1933
- No. 23/1933 – Clare Castle Pier Act 1933
- No. 24/1933 – Shannon Electricity (Amendment) Act 1933
- No. 25/1933 – Industrial Credit Act 1933
- No. 26/1933 – Agricultural Products (Regulation of Export) Act 1933
- No. 27/1933 – Cork Tramways (Employees' Compensation) Act 1933
- No. 28/1933 – Seeds and Fertilisers Supply Act 1933
- No. 29/1933 – Merchant Shipping (International Labour Conventions) Act 1933
- No. 30/1933 – Barrow Drainage Act 1933
- No. 31/1933 – Sugar Manufacture Act 1933
- No. 32/1933 – Garda Síochána (Pensions) Act 1933
- No. 33/1933 – Land Bond Act 1933
- No. 34/1933 – Approved Investments Act 1933
- No. 35/1933 – Damage To Property (Compensation) (Amendment) Act 1933
- No. 36/1933 – Moneylenders Act 1933
- No. 37/1933 – Public Services (Temporary Economies) Act 1933
- No. 38/1933 – Land Act 1933
- No. 39/1933 – Road Transport (No. 2) Act 1933
- No. 40/1933 – Constitution (Amendment No. 20) Act 1933
- No. 41/1933 – Constitution (Amendment No. 21) Act 1933
- No. 42/1933 – Merchant Shipping (Safety and Load Line Conventions) Act 1933
- No. 43/1933 – Rates on Agricultural Land (Relief) Act 1933
- No. 44/1933 – Unemployment Insurance Act 1933
- No. 45/1933 – Constitution (Amendment No. 22) Act 1933
- No. 46/1933 – Unemployment Assistance Act 1933
- No. 47/1933 – Expiring Laws Act 1933
- No. 48/1933 – School Meals (Gaeltacht) Act 1933
- No. 49/1933 – Agricultural Produce (Cereals) (Amendment) Act 1933
- No. 50/1933 – Oireachtas (Payment of Members) Act 1933
- No. 51/1933 – Prisons Act 1933
- No. 52/1933 – Finance (Customs and Excise Duties) Act 1933
- No. 53/1933 – Sea Fisheries Protection Act 1933

Private Acts

- No. 1/1933 – Cork Harbour Act 1933
- No. 2/1933 – The Dublin General Cemetery Company's Act 1933
- No. 3/1933 – Pier and Harbour Provisional Order Confirmation Act 1933

=== 1934 ===
- No. 1/1934 – Dangerous Drugs Act 1934
- No. 2/1934 – Harbours (Regulation of Rates) Act 1934
- No. 3/1934 – Horse Breeding Act 1934
- No. 4/1934 – Trade Loans (Guarantee) (Amendment) Act 1934
- No. 5/1934 – Local Government (Amendment) Act 1934
- No. 6/1934 – Electricity (Supply) (Amendment) Act 1934
- No. 7/1934 – Acquisition of Land (Allotments) (Amendment) Act 1934
- No. 8/1934 – Central Fund Act 1934
- No. 9/1934 – Workmen's Compensation Act 1934
- No. 10/1934 – Defence Forces (Temporary Provisions) Act 1934
- No. 11/1934 – Land Bond Act 1934
- No. 12/1934 – Control of Imports Act 1934
- No. 13/1934 – Sheepskin (Control of Export) Act 1934
- No. 14/1934 – Registration of Maternity Homes Act 1934
- No. 15/1934 – Children Act 1934
- No. 16/1934 – Local Services (Temporary Economies) Act 1934
- No. 17/1934 – Road Transport Act 1934
- No. 18/1934 – Finance (Customs Duties) Act 1934
- No. 19/1934 – Customs Duties (Preferential Rates) Act 1934
- No. 20/1934 – Agriculture (Amendment) Act 1934
- No. 21/1934 – National Health Insurance Act 1934
- No. 22/1934 – Town and Regional Planning Act 1934
- No. 23/1934 – Public Assistance (Acquisition of Land) Act 1934
- No. 24/1934 – Fisheries (Tidal Waters) Act 1934
- No. 25/1934 – Poultry (Diseases) Act 1934
- No. 26/1934 – Defence Forces (Temporary Provisions) (No. 2) Act 1934
- No. 27/1934 – University College Dublin Act 1934
- No. 28/1934 – Appropriation Act 1934
- No. 29/1934 – Housing (Gaeltacht) (Amendment) Act 1934
- No. 30/1934 – Housing (Financial and Miscellaneous Provisions) (Amendment) Act 1934
- No. 31/1934 – Finance Act 1934
- No. 32/1934 – Imposition of Duties (Confirmation of Orders) Act 1934
- No. 33/1934 – Creamery (Amendment) Act 1934
- No. 34/1934 – Dairy Produce (Amendment) Act 1934
- No. 35/1934 – Limerick City Management Act 1934
- No. 36/1934 – Control of Manufactures Act 1934
- No. 37/1934 – Tobacco Act 1934
- No. 38/1934 – Electricity (Supply) (Amendment) (No. 2) Act 1934
- No. 39/1934 – Agricultural Co-Operative Societies (Debentures) Act 1934
- No. 40/1934 – Industrial Alcohol Act 1934
- No. 41/1934 – Agricultural Produce (Cereals) Act 1934
- No. 42/1934 – Slaughter of Cattle and Sheep Act 1934
- No. 43/1934 – Military Service Pensions Act 1934
- No. 44/1934 – Local Government (Amendment) (No. 2) Act 1934
- No. 45/1934 – Carriage by Sea (Heavy Articles) Act 1934
- No. 46/1934 – Expiring Laws Act 1934
- No. 47/1934 – Imposition of Duties (Confirmation of Orders) (No. 2) Act 1934

=== 1935 ===
- No. 1/1935 – Rates on Agricultural Land (Relief) Act 1935
- No. 2/1935 – Public Dance Halls Act 1935
- No. 3/1935 – Sale of Food and Drugs (Milk) Act 1935
- No. 4/1935 – Shannon Fisheries Act 1935
- No. 5/1935 – Electoral (Revision of Constituencies) Act 1935
- No. 6/1935 – Criminal Law Amendment Act 1935 (nicknamed the "Vice Act")
- No. 7/1935 – Finance (Miscellaneous Provisions) Act 1935
- No. 8/1935 – Central Fund Act 1935
- No. 9/1935 – Local Government (Extension of Franchise) Act 1935
- No. 10/1935 – Local Government (Dublin) Act 1935
- No. 11/1935 – Defence Forces (Temporary Provisions) Act 1935
- No. 12/1935 – Constitution (Amendment No. 26) Act 1935
- No. 13/1935 – Irish Nationality and Citizenship Act 1935
- No. 14/1935 – Aliens Act 1935
- No. 15/1935 – Agricultural Products (Regulation of Export) (Amendment) Act 1935
- No. 16/1935 – Local Loans Fund Act 1935
- No. 17/1935 – Pounds (Provision and Maintenance) Act 1935
- No. 18/1935 – Courthouses (Provision and Maintenance) Act 1935
- No. 19/1935 – Local Government (Temporary Provisions) (Amendment) Act 1935
- No. 20/1935 – Electricity (Supply) (Amendment) Act 1935
- No. 21/1935 – Dairy Produce (Price Stabilisation) Act 1935
- No. 22/1935 – Milk and Dairies Act 1935
- No. 23/1935 – Road Transport Act 1935
- No. 24/1935 – Pigs and Bacon Act 1935
- No. 25/1935 – Appropriation Act 1935
- No. 26/1935 – Agricultural Produce (Cereals) Act 1935
- No. 27/1935 – Imposition of Duties (Confirmation of Orders) Act 1935
- No. 28/1935 – Finance Act 1935
- No. 29/1935 – Widows' and Orphans' Pensions Act 1935
- No. 30/1935 – Rates on Agricultural Land (Relief) (No. 2) Act 1935
- No. 31/1935 – Approved Investments (Amendment) Act 1935
- No. 32/1935 – Diseases of Animals Act 1935
- No. 33/1935 – Fisheries (Tidal Waters) (Amendment) Act 1935
- No. 34/1935 – Fisheries Act 1935
- No. 35/1935 – Trade Union Act 1935
- No. 36/1935 – Agricultural Produce (Fresh Meat) (Amendment) Act 1935
- No. 37/1935 – Slaughter of Cattle and Sheep (Amendment) Act 1935
- No. 38/1935 – Unemployment Assistance (Amendment) Act 1935
- No. 39/1935 – National Loan (Conversion) Act 1935
- No. 40/1935 – League of Nations (Obligations of Membership) Act 1935
- No. 41/1935 – Local Government (Dissolved Authorities) Act 1935
- No. 42/1935 – Local Authorities (Mutual Assurance) Act 1935
- No. 43/1935 – Railways Act 1935
- No. 44/1935 – Cork Fever Hospital Act 1935
- No. 45/1935 – Slaughter of Animals, Act 1935
- No. 46/1935 – Expiring Laws Act 1935
- No. 47/1935 – Imposition of Duties (Confirmation of Orders) (No. 2) Act 1935

Private Acts

- No. 1/1935 – Bank of Ireland Act 1935
- No. 2/1935 – Galway Harbour Act 1935
- No. 3/1935 – Cork Milling Company Railway Act 1935

=== 1936 ===
- No. 1/1936 – Land Purchase (Guarantee Fund) Act 1936
- No. 2/1936 – Conditions of Employment Act 1936
- No. 3/1936 – Defence Forces (Temporary Provisions) Act 1936
- No. 4/1936 – Harbours, Docks and Piers (Charges) Act 1936
- No. 5/1936 – School Attendance Act 1936
- No. 6/1936 – Spanish Trade Agreement Act 1936
- No. 7/1936 – Finance (Special Drawback) Act 1936
- No. 8/1936 – Weights and Measures Act 1936
- No. 9/1936 – Poor Relief (Dublin) Act 1936
- No. 10/1936 – Imposition of Duties (Confirmation of Order) Act 1936
- No. 11/1936 – Central Fund Act 1936
- No. 12/1936 – National Health Insurance and Widows' and Orphans' Pensions Act 1936
- No. 13/1936 – Housing (Financial and Miscellaneous Provisions) (Amendment) Act 1936
- No. 14/1936 – Agricultural Seeds Act 1936
- No. 15/1936 – Dáil Éireann Loans and Funds (Amendment) Act 1936
- No. 16/1936 – Sugar (Control of Import) Act 1936
- No. 17/1936 – Constitution (Amendment No. 23) Act 1936
- No. 18/1936 – Constitution (Amendment No. 24) Act 1936
- No. 19/1936 – Telephone Capital Act 1936
- No. 20/1936 – Flax Act 1936
- No. 21/1936 – Dublin Fever Hospital Act 1936
- No. 22/1936 – Electoral (University Constituencies) Act 1936
- No. 23/1936 – Turf (Use and Development) Act 1936
- No. 24/1936 – Labourers Act 1936
- No. 25/1936 – Rates on Agricultural Land (Relief) Act 1936
- No. 26/1936 – Seanad Éireann (Consequential Provisions) Act 1936
- No. 27/1936 – Housing (Financial and Miscellaneous Provisions) (Amendment) (No. 2) Act 1936
- No. 28/1936 – Imposition of Duties (Confirmation of Order) (No. 2) Act 1936
- No. 29/1936 – Bread (Regulation of Prices) Act 1936
- No. 30/1936 – Agricultural Produce (Cereals) Act 1936
- No. 31/1936 – Finance Act 1936
- No. 32/1936 – Appropriation Act 1936
- No. 33/1936 – Slaughter of Cattle and Sheep (Amendment) Act 1936
- No. 34/1936 – Registration of Births and Deaths Act 1936
- No. 35/1936 – Registration of Marriages Act 1936
- No. 36/1936 – Aran Islands (Transport) Act 1936
- No. 37/1936 – Connaught Rangers (Pensions) Act 1936
- No. 38/1936 – Noxious Weeds Act 1936
- No. 39/1936 – Superannuation Act 1936
- No. 40/1936 – Air Navigation and Transport Act 1936
- No. 41/1936 – Land Act 1936
- No. 42/1936 – Night Work (Bakeries) Act 1936
- No. 43/1936 – Milk (Regulation of Supply and Price) Act 1936
- No. 44/1936 – Sale of Food and Drugs (Milk) Act 1936
- No. 45/1936 – Insurance Act 1936
- No. 46/1936 – Local Government Act 1936
- No. 47/1936 – Marriages Act 1936
- No. 48/1936 – Courts of Justice Act 1936
- No. 49/1936 – Expiring Laws Act 1936
- No. 50/1936 – Vocational Education (Amendment) Act 1936
- No. 51/1936 – Registry of Friendly Societies Act 1936
- No. 52/1936 – Imposition of Duties (Confirmation of Orders) (No. 3) Act 1936
- No. 53/1936 – Agricultural Wages Act 1936
- No. 54/1936 – Liffey Reservoir Act 1936
- No. 55/1936 – Local Authorities (Miscellaneous Provisions) Act 1936
- No. 56/1936 – Agricultural Produce (Cereals) (Amendment) Act 1936
- No. 57/1936 – Constitution (Amendment No. 27) Act 1936
- No. 58/1936 – Executive Authority (External Relations) Act 1936

Private Acts

- No. 1/1936 – Poë Name and Arms (Compton Domvile Estates) Act 1936
- No. 2/1936 – National Maternity Hospital, Dublin (Charter Amendment) Act 1936

=== 1937 ===
- No. 1/1937 – Spanish Civil War (Non-Intervention) Act 1937
- No. 2/1937 – Public Assistance Act 1937
- No. 3/1937 – Circuit Court (Registration of Judgments) Act 1937
- No. 4/1937 – Whale Fisheries Act 1937
- No. 5/1937 – Garda Síochána Act 1937
- No. 6/1937 – Defence Forces (Temporary Provisions) Act 1937
- No. 7/1937 – Post Office (Evasion of Postage) Act 1937
- No. 8/1937 – Control of Imports (Amendment) Act 1937
- No. 9/1937 – Merchant Shipping (Spanish Civil War) Act 1937
- No. 10/1937 – Central Fund Act 1937
- No. 11/1937 – Widows' and Orphans' Pensions Act 1937
- No. 12/1937 – Imposition of Duties (Confirmation of Orders) Act 1937
- No. 13/1937 – Local Authorities (Electrical Employees) Act 1937
- No. 14/1937 – Local Elections Act 1937
- No. 15/1937 – Army Pensions Act 1937
- No. 16/1937 – Plebiscite (Draft Constitution) Act 1937
- No. 17/1937 – Local Loans Fund (Amendment) Act 1937
- No. 18/1937 – Finance Act 1937
- No. 19/1937 – Dairy Produce (Amendment) Act 1937
- No. 20/1937 – Executive Powers (Consequential Provisions) Act 1937
- No. 21/1937 – Court Officers (Amendment) Act 1937
- No. 22/1937 – Appropriation Act 1937
- No. 23/1937 – Pigs and Bacon Act 1937
- No. 24/1937 – Dublin Hospitals Act 1937
- No. 25/1937 – Electoral (Chairman of Dáil Éireann) Act 1937
- No. 26/1937 – Control of Prices Act 1937
- No. 27/1937 – Agricultural Produce (Cereals) (Amendment) Act 1937
- No. 28/1937 – Commissioner of Valuation (Substitute) Act 1937
- No. 29/1937 – Expiring Laws Act 1937
- No. 30/1937 – Seanad Electoral (University Members) Act 1937
- No. 31/1937 – Imposition of Duties (Confirmation of Orders) (No. 2) Act 1937
- No. 32/1937 – Presidential Elections Act 1937
- No. 33/1937 – Sea Fisheries (Protection of Immature Fish) Act 1937
- No. 34/1937 – Fisheries (Tidal Waters) (Amendment) Act 1937
- No. 35/1937 – Fisheries Act 1937
- No. 36/1937 – Local Government (Nomination of Presidential Candidates) Act 1937
- No. 37/1937 – Presidential Seal Act 1937
- No. 38/1937 – Interpretation Act 1937
- No. 39/1937 – Irish Nationality and Citizenship (Amendment) Act 1937
- No. 40/1937 – Constitution (Consequential Provisions) Act 1937
- No. 41/1937 – Defence Forces Act 1937
- No. 42/1937 – Housing and Labourers Act 1937
- No. 43/1937 – Seanad Electoral (Panel Members) Act 1937

Private Acts

- No. 1/1937 – Pier and Harbour Provisional Order Confirmation Act 1937
- No. 2/1937 – Local Government and Public Health Provisional Order Confirmation Act 1937
- No. 3/1937 – Local Government (Galway) Act 1937

=== 1938 ===
- No. 1/1938 – Agricultural Produce (Fresh Meat) (Amendment) Act 1938
- No. 2/1938 – Unemployment Assistance (Amendment) Act 1938
- No. 3/1938 – Shops (Hours of Trading) Act 1938
- No. 4/1938 – Shops (Conditions of Employment) Act 1938
- No. 5/1938 – Sheepskin (Control of Export) (Amendment) Act 1938
- No. 6/1938 – Scrap Iron (Control of Export) Act 1938
- No. 7/1938 – Shannon Fisheries Act 1938
- No. 8/1938 – Defence Forces (Temporary Provisions) Act 1938
- No. 9/1938 – Central Fund Act 1938
- No. 10/1938 – Cork Fever Hospital (Amendment) Act 1938
- No. 11/1938 – Cement (Amendment) Act 1938
- No. 12/1938 – Finance (Agreement With United Kingdom) Act 1938
- No. 13/1938 – Agreement With United Kingdom (Capital Sum) Act 1938
- No. 14/1938 – Agricultural Products (Regulation of Import) Act 1938
- No. 15/1938 – Prices Commission (Extension of Functions) Act 1938
- No. 16/1938 – Agricultural Produce (Cereals) Act 1938
- No. 17/1938 – Diseases of Animals Act 1938
- No. 18/1938 – Collection of Taxes (Confirmation) Act 1938
- No. 19/1938 – Imposition of Duties (Confirmation of Orders) Act 1938
- No. 20/1938 – Appropriation Act 1938
- No. 21/1938 – Public Hospitals (Amendment) Act 1938
- No. 22/1938 – Slaughtered and Detained Animals (Compensation) Act 1938
- No. 23/1938 – Industrial Alcohol Act 1938
- No. 24/1938 – Presidential Establishment Act 1938
- No. 25/1938 – Finance Act 1938
- No. 26/1938 – Old Age Pensions Act 1938
- No. 27/1938 – Telephone Capital Act 1938
- No. 28/1938 – Expiring Laws Act 1938
- No. 29/1938 – Public Servants (Continuity of Service) Act 1938
- No. 30/1938 – Dairy Produce (Price Stabilisation) (Amendment) Act 1938
- No. 31/1938 – Insurance (Amendment) Act 1938
- No. 32/1938 – Red Cross Act 1938
- No. 33/1938 – Defence Forces (Pensions) (Amendment) Act 1938
- No. 34/1938 – Oireachtas (Allowances To Members) Act 1938
- No. 35/1938 – Pigs and Bacon (Amendment) Act 1938
- No. 36/1938 – Imposition of Duties (Confirmation of Orders) (No. 2) Act 1938
- No. 37/1938 – Statutory Declarations Act 1938
- No. 38/1938 – Ministerial and Parliamentary Offices Act 1938

Private Acts

- No. 1/1938 – Erasmus Smith Schools Act 1938
- No. 2/1938 – Mountjoy Square, Dublin, Act 1938

=== 1939 ===
- No. 1/1939 – Holidays (Employees) Act 1939
- No. 2/1939 – Agricultural Produce (Eggs) Act 1939
- No. 3/1939 – Housing (Amendment) Act 1939
- No. 4/1939 – Hospitals Act 1939
- No. 5/1939 – Trade Loans (Guarantee) Act 1939
- No. 6/1939 – Tariff Commission (Repeal) Act 1939
- No. 7/1939 – Defence Forces (Temporary Provisions) Act 1939
- No. 8/1939 – Central Fund Act 1939
- No. 9/1939 – Local Government (Amendment) Act 1939
- No. 10/1939 – Treason Act 1939
- No. 11/1939 – Town and Regional Planning (Amendment) Act 1939
- No. 12/1939 – Merchant Shipping (Amendment) Act 1939
- No. 13/1939 – Offences Against The State Act 1939
- No. 14/1939 – Local Authorities (Combined Purchasing) Act 1939
- No. 15/1939 – Public Hospitals (Amendment) Act 1939
- No. 16/1939 – Clerk of Seanad Éireann (Compensation) Act 1939
- No. 17/1939 – Fisheries Act 1939
- No. 18/1939 – Finance Act 1939
- No. 19/1939 – Appropriation Act 1939
- No. 20/1939 – Imposition of Duties (Confirmation of Orders) Act 1939
- No. 21/1939 – Air-Raid Precautions Act 1939
- No. 22/1939 – Agricultural Produce (Cereals) Act 1939
- No. 23/1939 – Rates on Agricultural Land (Relief) Act 1939
- No. 24/1939 – Tourist Traffic Act 1939
- No. 25/1939 – Waterford City Management Act 1939
- No. 26/1939 – Land Act 1939
- No. 27/1939 – Public Assistance Act 1939
- No. 28/1939 – Emergency Powers Act 1939
- No. 29/1939 – Public Hospitals (Amendment) (No. 2) Act 1939
- No. 30/1939 – Expiring Laws Act 1939
- No. 31/1939 – Diplomatic and Consular Fees Act 1939
- No. 32/1939 – Imposition of Duties (Confirmation of Orders) (No. 2) Act 1939
- No. 33/1939 – Finance (No. 2) Act 1939
- No. 34/1939 – Housing (Gaeltacht) (Amendment) Act 1939
- No. 35/1939 – Pigs and Bacon (Amendment) Act 1939
- No. 36/1939 – Ministers and Secretaries (Amendment) Act 1939

Constitutional Amendments

- First Amendment of the Constitution Act 1939

== 1940–1949 ==
=== 1940 ===
- No. 1/1940 – Emergency Powers (Amendment) Act 1940
- No. 2/1940 – Offences Against the State (Amendment) Act 1940
- No. 3/1940 – Defence Forces (Temporary Provisions) Act 1940
- No. 4/1940 – Unemployment Assistance (Amendment) Act 1940
- No. 5/1940 – Central Fund Act 1940
- No. 6/1940 – Seeds and Fertilisers Supply Act 1940
- No. 7/1940 – Fire Brigades Act 1940
- No. 8/1940 – Local Government (Remission of Rates) Act 1940
- No. 9/1940 – Public Hospitals (Amendment) Act 1940
- No. 10/1940 – Housing (Amendment) Act 1940
- No. 11/1940 – Defence Forces (Temporary Provisions) (No. 2) Act 1940
- No. 12/1940 – County Management Act 1940
- No. 13/1940 – Institute For Advanced Studies Act 1940
- No. 14/1940 – Finance Act 1940
- No. 15/1940 – Local Authorities (Officers and Employees) (Amendment) Act 1940
- No. 16/1940 – Emergency Powers (Amendment) (No. 2) Act 1940
- No. 17/1940 – Appropriation Act 1940
- No. 18/1940 – Emergency Powers (Continuance) Act 1940
- No. 19/1940 – Local Elections (Amendment) Act 1940
- No. 20/1940 – Seanad Electoral (Panel Members) (Bye-Elections) Act 1940
- No. 21/1940 – Local Government (Dublin) (Amendment) Act 1940
- No. 22/1940 – Local Authorities (Cost of Living) Act 1940
- No. 23/1940 – Enforcement of Court Orders Act 1940
- No. 24/1940 – Pigs and Bacon Act 1940
- No. 25/1940 – Exported Live Stock (Insurance) Act 1940
- No. 26/1940 – Imposition of Duties (Confirmation of Orders) Act 1940
- No. 27/1940 – Offences Against the State (Forfeiture) Act 1940
- No. 28/1940 – Local Loans Fund (Amendment) Act 1940
- No. 29/1940 – Acquisition of Derelict Sites Act 1940
- No. 30/1940 – University Colleges Act 1940
- No. 31/1940 – Minerals Development Act 1940
- No. 32/1940 – Expiring Laws Act 1940
- No. 33/1940 – Widows' and Orphans' Pensions (Amendment) Act 1940
- No. 34/1940 – Unemployment (Relief Works) Act 1940
- No. 35/1940 – Imposition of Duties (Confirmation of Orders) (No. 2) Act 1940

Private Acts

- No. 1/1940 – Local Government and Public Health Provisional Order Confirmation Act 1940
- No. 2/1940 – Pier and Harbour Provisional Order Confirmation Act 1940
- No. 3/1940 – Pier and Harbour Provisional Order Confirmation (No. 2) Act 1940
- No. 4/1940 – Dublin Port and Docks Act 1940

=== 1941 ===
- No. 1/1941 – Electricity (Supply) (Amendment) Act 1941
- No. 2/1941 – Army Pensions Act 1941
- No. 3/1941 – Unemployment Insurance Act 1941
- No. 4/1941 – Central Fund Act 1941
- No. 5/1941 – Cork City Management (Amendment) Act 1941
- No. 6/1941 – Defence Forces (Temporary Provisions) Act 1941
- No. 7/1941 – Seeds and Fertilisers Supply Act 1941
- No. 8/1941 – Slievardagh Coalfield Development Act 1941
- No. 9/1941 – Dairy Produce (Price Stabilisation) (Amendment) Act 1941
- No. 10/1941 – Dairy Produce (Amendment) Act 1941
- No. 11/1941 – Milk (Regulation of Supply and Price) (Amendment) Act 1941
- No. 12/1941 – Children Act 1941
- No. 13/1941 – Minerals Exploration and Development Company Act 1941
- No. 14/1941 – Finance Act 1941
- No. 15/1941 – Local Officers and Servants (Dublin) Act 1941
- No. 16/1941 – Emergency Powers (Continuance) Act 1941
- No. 17/1941 – Appropriation Act 1941
- No. 18/1941 – Housing (Amendment) Act 1941
- No. 19/1941 – Garda Síochána (Compensation) Act 1941
- No. 20/1941 – Local Elections (Amendment) Act 1941
- No. 21/1941 – Offences Against the State (Forfeiture) Act 1941
- No. 22/1941 – Trade Union Act 1941
- No. 23/1941 – Local Government Act 1941
- No. 24/1941 – Neutrality (War Damage To Property) Act 1941
- No. 25/1941 – Imposition of Duties (Confirmation of Orders) Act 1941
- No. 26/1941 – Expiring Laws Act 1941
- No. 27/1941 – Agriculture (Amendment) Act 1941
- No. 28/1941 – Electoral Act 1941

Private Acts

- No. 1/1941 – Local Government and Public Health Provisional Order Confirmation Act 1941
- No. 2/1941 – Pier and Harbour Provisional Order Confirmation Act 1941

Constitutional Amendments

- Second Amendment of the Constitution Act 1941

=== 1942 ===
- No. 1/1942 – Water Supplies Act 1942
- No. 2/1942 – Shops (Conditions of Employment) (Amendment) Act 1942
- No. 3/1942 – Defence Forces (Temporary Provisions) Act 1942
- No. 4/1942 – Central Fund Act 1942
- No. 5/1942 – National Health Insurance Act 1942
- No. 6/1942 – Imposition of Duties (Confirmation of Orders) Act 1942
- No. 7/1942 – Insurance (Intermittent Unemployment) Act 1942
- No. 8/1942 – Referendum Act 1942
- No. 9/1942 – Building Societies Act 1942
- No. 10/1942 – Air Navigation and Transport (Amendment) Act 1942
- No. 11/1942 – Seeds and Fertilisers Supply Act 1942
- No. 12/1942 – Taxes and Duties (Special Circumstances) Act 1942
- No. 13/1942 – County Management (Amendment) Act 1942
- No. 14/1942 – Finance Act 1942
- No. 15/1942 – Housing (Amendment) Act 1942
- No. 16/1942 – Offences Against the State (Forfeiture) Act 1942
- No. 17/1942 – Electricity Supply Board (Superannuation) Act 1942
- No. 18/1942 – Local Elections (Amendment) Act 1942
- No. 19/1942 – Emergency Powers (Continuance and Amendment) Act 1942
- No. 20/1942 – Appropriation Act 1942
- No. 21/1942 – Customs (Amendment) Act 1942
- No. 22/1942 – Central Bank Act 1942
- No. 23/1942 – Trade Union Act 1942
- No. 24/1942 – Superannuation Act 1942
- No. 25/1942 – Expiring Laws Act 1942
- No. 26/1942 – Registration of Title Act 1942
- No. 27/1942 – Electricity (Supply) (Amendment) Act 1942

=== 1943 ===
- No. 1/1943 – Defence Forces (Temporary Provisions) Act 1943
- No. 2/1943 – Exported Live Stock (Insurance) Act 1943
- No. 3/1943 – Saint Laurence's Hospital Act 1943
- No. 4/1943 – Seeds and Fertilisers Supply Act 1943
- No. 5/1943 – Central Fund Act 1943
- No. 6/1943 – Local Government (Remission of Rates) Act 1943
- No. 7/1943 – Intoxicating Liquor Act 1943
- No. 8/1943 – Accidental Fires Act 1943
- No. 9/1943 – Pawnbrokers (Divisional Auctioneers) Act 1943
- No. 10/1943 – Landlord and Tenant (Amendment) Act 1943
- No. 11/1943 – General Elections (Emergency Provisions) Act 1943
- No. 12/1943 – Solicitors Act 1943
- No. 13/1943 – District of Fergus Drainage Act 1943
- No. 14/1943 – Army Pensions Act 1943
- No. 15/1943 – Electoral (Polling Cards) Act 1943
- No. 16/1943 – Finance Act 1943
- No. 17/1943 – Creameries (Acquisition) Act 1943
- No. 18/1943 – Appropriation Act 1943
- No. 19/1943 – Vocational Education (Amendment) Act 1943
- No. 20/1943 – Unemployment Insurance Act 1943
- No. 21/1943 – Emergency Powers (Continuance) Act 1943
- No. 22/1943 – Central Fund (No. 2) Act 1943
- No. 23/1943 – Appropriation (No. 2) Act 1943
- No. 24/1943 – Expiring Laws Act 1943

=== 1944 ===
- No. 1/1944 – Housing (Amendment) Act 1944
- No. 2/1944 – Children's Allowances Act 1944
- No. 3/1944 – Agriculture (Amendment) Act 1944
- No. 4/1944 – Defence Forces (Temporary Provisions) Act 1944
- No. 5/1944 – Military Service Pensions (Amendment) Act 1944
- No. 6/1944 – Fisheries (Amendment) Act 1944
- No. 7/1944 – Seeds and Fertilisers Supply Act 1944
- No. 8/1944 – Constitution (Verification of Petition) Act 1944
- No. 9/1944 – Vocational Education (Amendment) Act 1944
- No. 10/1944 – Midwives Act 1944
- No. 11/1944 – Central Fund Act 1944
- No. 12/1944 – Conditions of Employment Act 1944
- No. 13/1944 – Local Authorities (Education Scholarships) Act 1944
- No. 14/1944 – Collection of Taxes (Confirmation) Act 1944
- No. 15/1944 – Trade Loans (Guarantee) (Amendment) Act 1944
- No. 16/1944 – Emergency Powers (Continuance) Act 1944
- No. 17/1944 – Appropriation Act 1944
- No. 18/1944 – Finance Act 1944
- No. 19/1944 – Comptroller and Auditor General (Amendment) Act 1944
- No. 20/1944 – Red Cross Act 1944
- No. 21/1944 – Transport Act 1944
- No. 22/1944 – Expiring Laws Act 1944

Private Acts

- No. 1/1944 – Local Government and Public Health Provisional Orders Confirmation Act 1944

=== 1945 ===
- No. 1/1945 – Garda Síochána (Compensation) (Amendment) Act 1945
- No. 2/1945 – Diseases of Animals Act 1945
- No. 3/1945 – Arterial Drainage Act 1945
- No. 4/1945 – Tuberculosis (Establishment of Sanatoria) Act 1945
- No. 5/1945 – Seeds and Fertilisers Supply Act 1945
- No. 6/1945 – Electoral (Dáil Éireann and Local Authorities) Act 1945
- No. 7/1945 – Minerals Company Act 1945
- No. 8/1945 – Local Government (Dublin) Act 1945
- No. 9/1945 – Central Fund Act 1945
- No. 10/1945 – Defence Forces (Temporary Provisions) Act 1945
- No. 11/1945 – Military Service Pensions (Amendment) Act 1945
- No. 12/1945 – Electricity (Supply) (Amendment) Act 1945
- No. 13/1945 – Local Authorities (Cost of Living) (Amendment) Act 1945
- No. 14/1945 – Customs (Temporary Provisions) Act 1945
- No. 15/1945 – Presidential and Local Elections Act 1945
- No. 16/1945 – Racing Board and Racecourses Act 1945
- No. 17/1945 – Garda Síochána Act 1945
- No. 18/1945 – Irish Legal Terms Act 1945
- No. 19/1945 – Mental Treatment Act 1945
- No. 20/1945 – Finance Act 1945
- No. 21/1945 – Minister For Supplies (Transfer of Functions) Act 1945
- No. 22/1945 – King's Inns Library Act 1945
- No. 23/1945 – Unemployment Insurance Act 1945
- No. 24/1945 – Juries Act 1945
- No. 25/1945 – Court Officers Act 1945
- No. 26/1945 – Emergency Powers (Continuance and Amendment) Act 1945
- No. 27/1945 – Appropriation Act 1945
- No. 28/1945 – Local Government (Remission of Rates) Act 1945
- No. 29/1945 – Documents and Pictures (Regulation of Export) Act 1945
- No. 30/1945 – Local Authorities (Acceptance of Gifts) Act 1945
- No. 31/1945 – National Stud Act 1945
- No. 32/1945 – Agricultural Wages (Amendment) Act 1945
- No. 33/1945 – Johnstown Castle Agricultural College Act 1945
- No. 34/1945 – Military Service Pensions (Amendment) (No. 2) Act 1945
- No. 35/1945 – Finance (Miscellaneous Provisions) Act 1945
- No. 36/1945 – Expiring Laws Act 1945
- No. 37/1945 – Lough Corrib Navigation Act 1945

Private Acts

- No. 1/1945 – Daniel Mcgrath Foundation Act 1945

=== 1946 ===
- No. 1/1946 – Censorship of Publications Act 1946
- No. 2/1946 – Housing (Amendment) Act 1946
- No. 3/1946 – Army Pensions Act 1946
- No. 4/1946 – Rent Restrictions Act 1946
- No. 5/1946 – Aran Islands Transport Act 1946
- No. 6/1946 – Central-Fund Act 1946
- No. 7/1946 – Defence Forges (Temporary Provisions) Act 1946
- No. 8/1946 – Children's Allowances (Amendment) Act 1946
- No. 9/1946 – Harbours Act 1946
- No. 10/1946 – Turf Development Act 1946
- No. 11/1946 – Imposition of Duties (Confirmation of Order) Act 1946
- No. 12/1946 – Land Act 1946
- No. 13/1946 – Forestry Act 1946
- No. 14/1946 – Tourist Traffic (Amendment) Act 1946
- No. 15/1946 – Finance Act 1946
- No. 16/1946 – Hire-Purchase Act 1946
- No. 17/1946 – Superannuation Act 1946
- No. 18/1946 – Appropriation Act 1946
- No. 19/1946 – Continuation of Compensation Schemes Act 1946
- No. 20/1946 – Local Government (Remission of Rates) Act 1946
- No. 21/1946 – Courts of Justice (District Court) Act 1946
- No. 22/1946 – Supplies and Services (Temporary Provisions) Act 1946
- No. 23/1946 – Air Navigation and Transport Act 1946
- No. 24/1946 – Local Government Act 1946
- No. 25/1946 – Industrial Research and Standards Act 1946
- No. 26/1946 – Industrial Relations Act 1946
- No. 27/1946 – Telephone Capital Act 1946
- No. 28/1946 – Air-Raid Precautions (Amendment) Act 1946
- No. 29/1946 – Presidential Elections (Amendment) Act 1946
- No. 30/1946 – Referendum (Amendment) Act 1946
- No. 31/1946 – Electoral (Amendment) Act 1946
- No. 32/1946 – Imposition of Duties (Confirmation of Order) (No. 2) Act 1946
- No. 33/1946 – Intoxicating Liquor Act 1946
- No. 34/1946 – Statistics (Amendment) Act 1946
- No. 35/1946 – Expiring Laws Act 1946
- No. 36/1946 – Rates on Agricultural Land (Relief) Act 1946
- No. 37/1946 – Unemployment Insurance Act 1946
- No. 38/1946 – Ministers and Secretaries (Amendment) Act 1946

=== 1947 ===
- No. 1/1947 – Vocational Education (Amendment) Act 1947
- No. 2/1947 – Industrial Alcohol (Amendment) Act 1947
- No. 3/1947 – Flax Act 1936 (Suspension) Act 1947
- No. 4/1947 – Defence Forces (Temporary Provisions) Act 1947
- No. 5/1947 – Customs-Free Airport Act 1947
- No. 6/1947 – The Industrial and Life Assurance Amalgamation Company, Limited (Acquisition of Shares) Act 1947
- No. 7/1947 – Central Fund Act 1947
- No. 8/1947 – Widows' and Orphans' Pensions Act 1947
- No. 9/1947 – National Health Insurance Act 1947
- No. 10/1947 – Auctioneers and House Agents Act 1947
- No. 11/1947 – Deeds of Bravery Act 1947
- No. 12/1947 – Immature Spirits (Restriction) Act 1947
- No. 13/1947 – Sinn Féin Funds Act 1947
- No. 14/1947 – Agricultural Credit Act 1947
- No. 15/1947 – Finance Act 1947
- No. 16/1947 – Dairy Produce (Amendment) Act 1947
- No. 17/1947 – Trade Union Act 1947
- No. 18/1947 – Agricultural and Fishery Products (Regulation of Export) Act 1947
- No. 19/1947 – Comptroller and Auditor General (Amendment) Act 1947
- No. 20/1947 – Courts of Justice Act 1947
- No. 21/1947 – Great Southern Railways Company (Superannuation Scheme) Act 1947
- No. 22/1947 – Presidential Establishment (Amendment) Act 1947
- No. 23/1947 – Oireachtas (Allowances To Members) (Amendment) Act 1947
- No. 24/1947 – Ministerial and Parliamentary Offices (Amendment) Act 1947
- No. 25/1947 – Appropriation Act 1947
- No. 26/1947 – Imposition of Duties (Confirmation of Order) Act 1947
- No. 27/1947 – Clean Wool Act 1947
- No. 28/1947 – Health Act 1947
- No. 29/1947 – Superannuation Act 1947
- No. 30/1947 – Civil Service (Transferred Officers) Compensation (Amendment) Act 1947
- No. 31/1947 – Electoral (Amendment) Act 1947
- No. 32/1947 – Live Stock (Artificial Insemination) Act 1947
- No. 33/1947 – Finance (No. 2) Act 1947
- No. 34/1947 – Harbours Act 1947
- No. 35/1947 – Minerals Company Act 1947
- No. 36/1947 – Solicitors (Amendment) Act 1947
- No. 37/1947 – Irish Shipping Limited Act 1947
- No. 38/1947 – Expiring Laws Act 1947
- No. 39/1947 – Supplies and Services (Temporary Provisions) Act 1946 (Continuance) Act 1947
- No. 40/1947 – Public Libraries Act 1947
- No. 41/1947 – Garda Síochána (Pensions) Act 1947
- No. 42/1947 – Seanad Electoral (Panel Members) Act 1947
- No. 43/1947 – Appropriation (No. 2) Act 1947
- No. 44/1947 – Statutory Instruments Act 1947
- No. 45/1947 – Industrial and Commercial Property (Protection) (Neuchatel Agreement) Act 1947
- No. 46/1947 – Merchant Shipping Act 1947
- No. 47/1947 – Health Services (Financial Provisions) Act 1947
- No. 48/1947 – Rates on Agricultural Land (Relief) Act 1947
- No. 49/1947 – Poultry Hatcheries Act 1947
- No. 50/1947 – Coroners (Amendment) Act 1947

=== 1948 ===
- No. 1/1948 – Housing Amendment Act 1948
- No. 2/1948 – Garda Síochána (Acquisition of Sites and Retention of Premises) Act 1948
- No. 3/1948 – Local Government (Sanitary Services) Act 1948
- No. 4/1948 – Local, Government (Superannuation) Act 1948
- No. 5/1948 – Defence Forces (Temporary Provisions) Act 1948
- No. 6/1948 – Central Fund Act 1948
- No. 7/1948 – Imposition of Duties (Confirmation of Order) Act 1948
- No. 8/1948 – Local Elections Act 1948
- No. 9/1948 – Connaught Rangers (Pensions) Act 1948
- No. 10/1948 – Social Welfare (Reciprocal Arrangements) Act 1948
- No. 11/1948 – Trade Union Act 1948
- No. 12/1948 – Finance Act 1948
- No. 13/1948 – Appropriation Act 1948
- No. 14/1948 – Local Government (Remission of Rates) Act 1948
- No. 15/1948 – Local Government (Dublin) (Temporary) Act 1948
- No. 16/1948 – Road Fund (Advances) Act 1948
- No. 17/1948 – Social Welfare Act 1948
- No. 18/1948 – Supplies and Services (Temporary Provisions) Act 1946 (Continuance) Act 1948
- No. 19/1948 – Nurses Registration Act 1948
- No. 20/1948 – Rates on Agricultural Land (Relief) Act 1948
- No. 21/1948 – Expiring Laws Act 1948
- No. 22/1948 – The Republic of Ireland Act 1948
- No. 23/1948 – Workmen's Compensation (Amendment) Act 1948
- No. 24/1948 – Agriculture (Amendment) Act 1948

=== 1949 ===
- No. 1/1949 – Defence Forces (Temporary Provisions) Act 1949
- No. 2/1949 – Imposition of Duties (Confirmation of Orders) Act 1949
- No. 3/1949 – Local Loans Fund (Amendment) Act 1949
- No. 4/1949 – Housing (Gaeltacht) (Amendment) Act 1949
- No. 5/1949 – Central Fund Act 1949
- No. 6/1949 – Children (Amendment) Act 1949
- No. 7/1949 – Defence Forces (Pensions) (Amendment) Act 1949
- No. 8/1949 – Courts of Justice (District Court) Act 1949
- No. 9/1949 – Trade Loans (Guarantee) (Amendment) Act 1949
- No. 10/1949 – Diseases of Animals Act 1949
- No. 11/1949 – Trade Union Act 1949
- No. 12/1949 – Electricity (Supply) (Amendment) Act 1949
- No. 13/1949 – Finance Act 1949
- No. 14/1949 – Seeds and Fertilisers Supply Act 1949
- No. 15/1949 – Continuation of Compensation Schemes Act 1946 (Amendment) Act 1949
- No. 16/1949 – Infanticide Act 1949
- No. 17/1949 – Local Authorities (Works) Act 1949
- No. 18/1949 – Fisheries (Amendment) Act 1949
- No. 19/1949 – Army Pensions Act 1949
- No. 20/1949 – Imposition of Duties (Confirmation of Orders) (No. 2) Act 1949
- No. 21/1949 – Ministerial and Parliamentary Offices (Amendment) Act 1949
- No. 22/1949 – Alginate Industries (Ireland) Limited (Acquisition of Shares) Act 1949
- No. 23/1949 – Housing (Amendment) Act 1949
- No. 24/1949 – Rent Restrictions (Amendment) Act 1949
- No. 25/1949 – Land Reclamation Act 1949
- No. 26/1949 – Appropriation Act 1949
- No. 27/1949 – Fisheries (Statute Law Revision) Act 1949
- No. 28/1949 – Army Pensions (Increase) Act 1949
- No. 29/1949 – Military Service Pensions (Amendment) Act 1949
- No. 30/1949 – Expiring Laws Act 1949
- No. 31/1949 – Supplies and Services (Temporary Provisions) Act 1946 (Continuance) Act 1949
- No. 32/1949 – Industrial and Commercial Property (Protection) (Amendment) Act 1949
- No. 33/1949 – Irish News Agency Act 1949

== 1950–1959 ==
=== 1950 ===
- No. 1/1950 – Customs (Temporary Provisions) Act 1945 (Continuance) Act 1950
- No. 2/1950 – Defence Forces (Temporary Provisions) Act 1950
- No. 3/1950 – Pensions (Increase) Act 1950
- No. 4/1950 – Air Navigation and Transport Act 1950
- No. 5/1950 – Minerals Company (Amendment) Act 1950
- No. 6/1950 – Irish Whiskey Act 1950
- No. 7/1950 – Local Government (Remission of Rates) Act 1950
- No. 8/1950 – Central Fund Act 1950
- No. 9/1950 – Flax Act 1936 (Suspension) Act 1950
- No. 10/1950 – Exported Live Stock (Insurance) Act 1950
- No. 11/1950 – Imposition of Duties (Confirmation of Order) Act 1950
- No. 12/1950 – Transport Act 1950
- No. 13/1950 – Local Loans Fund (Amendment) Act 1950
- No. 14/1950 – Social Welfare Act 1950
- No. 15/1950 – Erne Drainage and Development Act 1950
- No. 16/1950 – Land Act 1950
- No. 17/1950 – Imposition of Duties (Confirmation of Orders) (No. 2) Act 1950
- No. 18/1950 – Finance Act 1950
- No. 19/1950 – Trade Union Act 1950
- No. 20/1950 – Appropriation Act 1950
- No. 21/1950 – Agricultural Workers (Holidays) Act 1950
- No. 22/1950 – Rates on Agricultural Land (Relief) Act 1950
- No. 23/1950 – Turf Development Act 1950
- No. 24/1950 – Limerick City Management Act 1950
- No. 25/1950 – Housing (Amendment) Act 1950
- No. 26/1950 – Local Government (Repeal of Enactments) Act 1950
- No. 27/1950 – Nurses Act 1950
- No. 28/1950 – Rent Restrictions (Continuance and Amendment) Act 1950
- No. 29/1950 – Industrial Development Authority Act 1950
- No. 30/1950 – Macswiney (Pension) Act 1950
- No. 31/1950 – Expiring Laws Act 1950
- No. 32/1950 – Coinage Act 1950
- No. 33/1950 – Vocational Education (Amendment) Act 1950
- No. 34/1950 – Supplies and Services (Temporary Provisions) Act 1946 (Continuance and Amendment) Act 1950

Private Acts

- No. 1/1950 – Local Government Provisional Orders Confirmation Act 1950

=== 1951 ===
- No. 1/1951 – Tortfeasors Act 1951
- No. 2/1951 – Criminal Justice Act 1951
- No. 3/1951 – Imposition of Duties (Confirmation of Orders) Act 1951
- No. 4/1951 – Rates on Agricultural Land (Relief) Act 1951
- No. 5/1951 – Meath Hospital Act 1951
- No. 6/1951 – Defence Forces (Temporary Provisions) Act 1951
- No. 7/1951 – Central Fund Act 1951
- No. 8/1951 – Court Officers Act 1951
- No. 9/1951 – Arts Act 1951
- No. 10/1951 – Collection of Taxes (Confirmation) Act 1951
- No. 11/1951 – Imposition of Duties (Confirmation of Order) (No. 2) Act 1951
- No. 12/1951 – Government Loans (Conversion) Act 1951
- No. 13/1951 – Agricultural Workers (Weekly Half-Holidays) Act 1951
- No. 14/1951 – Trade Union Act 1951
- No. 15/1951 – Finance Act 1951
- No. 16/1951 – Social Welfare Act 1951
- No. 17/1951 – Post Office (Amendment) Act 1951
- No. 18/1951 – Local Loans Fund (Amendment) Act 1951
- No. 19/1951 – Telephone Capital Act 1951
- No. 20/1951 – Appropriation Act 1951
- No. 21/1951 – Freshwater Fisheries (Prohibition of Netting) Act 1951
- No. 22/1951 – Seeds and Fertilisers Supply Act 1951
- No. 23/1951 – Local Government (Remission of Rates) Act 1951
- No. 24/1951 – Imposition of Duties (Confirmation of Orders) (No. 3) Act 1951
- No. 25/1951 – Fishing Licences (Moville District) Act 1951
- No. 26/1951 – Expiring Laws Act 1951
- No. 27/1951 – Supplies and Services (Temporary Provisions) Act 1946 (Continuance) Act 1951
- No. 28/1951 – Grain Storage (Loans) Act 1951
- No. 29/1951 – Medical Practitioners Act 1951
- No. 30/1951 – Pharmacy Act 1951

Private Acts

- No. 1/1951 – Waterford (Extension of Harbour Limits) Harbour Works Order, 1951, Confirmation Act 1951

=== 1952 ===
- No. 1/1952 – Undeveloped Areas Act 1952
- No. 2/1952 – Defence Forces (Temporary Provisions) Act 1952
- No. 3/1952 – Rates on Agricultural Land (Relief) Act 1952
- No. 4/1952 – Electricity (Supply) (Amendment) Act 1952
- No. 5/1952 – Foyle Fisheries Act 1952
- No. 6/1952 – Central Fund Act 1952
- No. 7/1952 – Sea Fisheries Act 1952
- No. 8/1952 – Vital Statistics and Births, Deaths and Marriages Registration Act 1952
- No. 9/1952 – Milk (Regulation of Supply and Price) (Amendment) Act 1952
- No. 10/1952 – Imposition of Duties (Confirmation of Orders) Act 1952
- No. 11/1952 – Social Welfare Act 1952
- No. 12/1952 – Social Welfare (Children's Allowances) Act 1952
- No. 13/1952 – Trade Union Act 1952
- No. 14/1952 – Finance Act 1952
- No. 15/1952 – Tourist Traffic Act 1952
- No. 16/1952 – Housing (Amendment) Act 1952
- No. 17/1952 – Appropriation Act 1952
- No. 18/1952 – Veterinary Surgeons Act 1952
- No. 19/1952 – Ministerial and Parliamentary Offices (Amendment) Act 1952
- No. 20/1952 – Rent Restrictions (Continuance and Amendment) Act 1952
- No. 21/1952 – Imposition of Duties (Confirmation of Orders) (No. 2) Act 1952
- No. 22/1952 – Local Government (Sanitary Services) (Joint Burial Boards) Act 1952
- No. 23/1952 – Local Government (Remission of Rates) Act 1952
- No. 24/1952 – Finance (Excise Duties) (Vehicles) Act 1952
- No. 25/1952 – Adoption Act 1952
- No. 26/1952 – Agricultural Workers (Weekly Half-Holidays) Act 1952
- No. 27/1952 – Pensions Act 1952
- No. 28/1952 – Expiring Laws Act 1952
- No. 29/1952 – Merchant Shipping (Safety Convention) Act 1952
- No. 30/1952 – Supplies and Services (Temporary Provisions) Act 1946 (Continuance) Act 1952

=== 1953 ===
- No. 1/1953 – Defence Forces (Temporary Provisions) Act 1953
- No. 2/1953 – Trade Loans (Guarantee) (Amendment) Act 1953
- No. 3/1953 – Local Loans Fund (Amendment) Act 1953
- No. 4/1953 – Connaught Rangers (Pensions) Act 1953
- No. 5/1953 – Military Service Pensions (Amendment) Act 1953
- No. 6/1953 – Housing (Gaeltacht) (Amendment) Act 1953
- No. 7/1953 – Insurance Act 1953
- No. 8/1953 – National Stud Act 1953
- No. 9/1953 – Central Fund Act 1953
- No. 10/1953 – Local Government (Dublin) (Amendment) Act 1953
- No. 11/1953 – Grass Meal (Production) Act 1953
- No. 12/1953 – Local Government Act 1953
- No. 13/1953 – Department of Lands (Establishment of Foresters) Act 1953
- No. 14/1953 – Restrictive Trade Practices Act 1953
- No. 15/1953 – Local Elections Act 1953
- No. 16/1953 – Fisheries (Amendment) Act 1953
- No. 17/1953 – Great Northern Railway Act 1953
- No. 18/1953 – Land Act 1953
- No. 19/1953 – Turf Development Act 1953
- No. 20/1953 – Imposition of Duties (Confirmation of Orders) Act 1953
- No. 21/1953 – Finance Act 1953
- No. 22/1953 – Central Fund (No. 2) Act 1953
- No. 23/1953 – Army Pensions Act 1953
- No. 24/1953 – Comptroller and Auditor General (Amendment) Act 1953
- No. 25/1953 – Workmen's Compensation (Amendment) Act 1953
- No. 26/1953 – Health Act 1953
- No. 27/1953 – Telegraph Act 1953
- No. 28/1953 – Friendly Societies (Amendment) Act 1953
- No. 29/1953 – Appropriation Act 1953
- No. 30/1953 – Intoxicating Liquor Act 1953
- No. 31/1953 – Supplies and Services (Temporary Provisions) Act 1946 (Continuance) Act 1953
- No. 32/1953 – Courts of Justice Act 1953
- No. 33/1953 – Imposition of Duties (Confirmation of Orders) (No. 2) Act 1953
- No. 34/1953 – Rent Restrictions (Continuance and Amendment) Act 1953
- No. 35/1953 – Mental Treatment Act 1953
- No. 36/1953 – Rates on Agricultural Land (Relief) Act 1953
- No. 37/1953 – Vocational Education (Amendment) Act 1953

Private Acts

- No. 1/1953 – Local Government Provisional Order Confirmation Act 1953
- No. 2/1953 – The Royal Hospital For Incurables, Dublin (Charter Amendment) Act 1953

=== 1954 ===
- No. 1/1954 – Seanad Electoral (Panel Members) Act 1954
- No. 2/1954 – Rent Restrictions (Amendment) Act 1954
- No. 3/1954 – Local Loans Fund (Amendment) Act 1954
- No. 4/1954 – Salmon Conservancy Fund Act 1954
- No. 5/1954 – Defence Forces (Temporary Provisions) Act 1954
- No. 6/1954 – Diseases of Animals Act 1954
- No. 7/1954 – National Development Fund Act 1954
- No. 8/1954 – Local Government (Temporary Reduction of Valuation) Act 1954
- No. 9/1954 – State Guarantees Act 1954
- No. 10/1954 – Consular Conventions Act 1954
- No. 11/1954 – Industrial Research and Standards (Amendment) Act 1954
- No. 12/1954 – Intestates' Estates Act 1954
- No. 13/1954 – Central Fund Act 1954
- No. 14/1954 – Superannuation Act 1954
- No. 15/1954 – Imposition of Duties (Confirmation of Orders) Act 1954
- No. 16/1954 – Housing (Amendment) Act 1954
- No. 17/1954 – Electricity (Supply) (Amendment) Act 1954
- No. 18/1954 – Defence Act 1954
- No. 19/1954 – Collection of Taxes (Confirmation) Act 1954
- No. 20/1954 – Appropriation Act 1954
- No. 21/1954 – Land Act 1954
- No. 22/1954 – Finance Act 1954
- No. 23/1954 – Health Act 1954
- No. 24/1954 – Cork Fever Hospital (Amendment) Act 1954
- No. 25/1954 – State Property Act 1954
- No. 26/1954 – Arbitration Act 1954
- No. 27/1954 – Public Authorities (Judicial Proceedings) Act 1954
- No. 28/1954 – Red Cross Act 1954
- No. 29/1954 – Alginate Industries, (Ireland) Limited (Acquisition of Shares) Act 1954
- No. 30/1954 – Exchange Control Act 1954
- No. 31/1954 – Destructive Insects and Pests Act 1954
- No. 32/1954 – Mortmain (Repeal of Enactments) Act 1954
- No. 33/1954 – Agricultural Produce (Meat) (Miscellaneous Provisions) Act 1954
- No. 34/1954 – Rent Restrictions (Continuance and Amendment) Act 1954
- No. 35/1954 – Imposition of Duties (Confirmation of Orders) (No. 2) Act 1954
- No. 36/1954 – Solicitors Act 1954
- No. 37/1954 – National Monuments (Amendment) Act 1954
- No. 38/1954 – Trade Loans (Guarantee) (Amendment) Act 1954

Private Acts

- No. 1/1954 – Sir Patrick Dun's Hospital Act 1954

=== 1955 ===
- No. 1/1955 – Medical Practitioners Act 1955
- No. 2/1955 – Agriculture (Amendment) 1955
- No. 3/1955 – Supplies and Services (Temporary Provisions) Act 1946 (Continuance and Amendment) Act 1955
- No. 4/1955 – Central Fund Act 1955
- No. 5/1955 – Tourist Traffic Act 1955
- No. 6/1955 – Customs (Temporary Provisions) Act 1945 (Continuance) Act 1955
- No. 7/1955 – Imposition of Duties (Confirmation of Orders) Act 1955
- No. 8/1955 – Fertilisers Feeding Stuffs and Mineral Mixtures Act 1955
- No. 9/1955 – Local Government Act 1955
- No. 10/1955 – Factories Act 1955
- No. 11/1955 – Social Welfare Act 1955
- No. 12/1955 – City and County Management (Amendment) Act 1955
- No. 13/1955 – Finance Act 1955
- No. 14/1955 – Seed Production Act 1955
- No. 15/1955 – Appropriation Act 1955
- No. 16/1955 – Workmen's Compensation (Amendment) Act 1955
- No. 17/1955 – Sea Fisheries (Amendment) Act 1955
- No. 18/1955 – Charitable Donations and Bequests (Amendment) Act 1955
- No. 19/1955 – Industrial Relations (Amendment) Act 1955
- No. 20/1955 – Electricity (Supply) (Amendment) Act 1955
- No. 21/1955 – Transport (Miscellaneous Provisions) Act 1955
- No. 22/1955 – Imposition of Duties (Confirmation of Orders) (No. 2) Act 1955
- No. 23/1955 – Arterial Drainage (Amendment) Act 1955
- No. 24/1955 – Rent Restrictions (Continuance and Amendment) Act 1955
- No. 25/1955 – Transport Act 1955
- No. 26/1955 – Statutory Instruments (Amendment) Act 1955
- No. 27/1955 – Social Welfare (Temporary Provisions) Act 1955
- No. 28/1955 – Agricultural Produce (Eggs) Act 1955
- No. 29/1955 – Mercantile Marine Act 1955

Private Acts

- No. 1/1955 – Local Government Provisional Orders Confirmation Act 1955

=== 1956 ===
- No. 1/1956 – Control of Exports (Temporary Provisions) Act 1956
- No. 2/1956 – Gaming and Lotteries Act 1956
- No. 3/1956 – Fatal Injuries Act 1956
- No. 4/1956 – Wireless Telegraphy Act 1956
- No. 5/1956 – Agricultural Produce (Cereals) (Amendment) Act 1956
- No. 6/1956 – Forestry Act 1956
- No. 7/1956 – Customs Act 1956
- No. 8/1956 – Finance (Profits of Certain Mines) (Temporary Relief From Taxation) Act 1956
- No. 9/1956 – Prisons Act 1956
- No. 10/1956 – Local Government (Superannuation) Act 1956
- No. 11/1956 – Supplies and Services (Temporary Provisions) Act 1946 (Continuance) Act 1956
- No. 12/1956 – Central Fund Act 1956
- No. 13/1956 – Road Transport Act 1956
- No. 14/1956 – Imposition of Duties (Confirmation of Orders) Act 1956
- No. 15/1956 – Restrictive Trade Practices (Confirmation of Order) Act 1956
- No. 16/1956 – Restrictive Trade Practices (Confirmation Order) (No. 2) Act 1956
- No. 17/1956 – Opticians Act 1956
- No. 18/1956 – Rates on Agricultural Land (Relief) Act 1956
- No. 19/1956 – Seeds and Fertilisers Supply Act 1956
- No. 20/1956 – Tea (Importation and Distribution) Act 1956
- No. 21/1956 – Ministers and Secretaries (Amendment) Act 1956
- No. 22/1956 – Finance Act 1956
- No. 23/1956 – Telephone Capital Act 1956
- No. 24/1956 – Social Welfare (Amendment) Act 1956
- No. 25/1956 – Oil Pollution of the Sea Act 1956
- No. 26/1956 – Irish Nationality and Citizenship Act 1956
- No. 27/1956 – Prisoners of War and Enemy Aliens Act 1956
- No. 28/1956 – Fisheries (Statute Law Revision) Act 1956
- No. 29/1956 – Local Loans Fund (Amendment) Act 1956
- No. 30/1956 – Sea Fisheries (Amendment) Act 1956
- No. 31/1956 – Housing (Amendment) Act 1956
- No. 32/1956 – Appropriation Act 1956
- No. 33/1956 – Restrictive Trade Practices (Confirmation of Order) (No. 3) Act 1956
- No. 34/1956 – Imposition of Duties (Confirmation of Order) (No. 2) Act 1956
- No. 35/1956 – Local Government (Temporary Reduction of Valuation) Act 1956
- No. 36/1956 – Imposition of Duties (Confirmation of Orders) (No. 3) Act 1956
- No. 37/1956 – Pigs and Bacon (Amendment) Act 1956
- No. 38/1956 – Superannuation Act 1956
- No. 39/1956 – Dairy Produce (Price Stabilisation) (Amendment) Act 1956
- No. 40/1956 – Flour and Wheatenmeal Act 1956
- No. 41/1956 – Animal Remedies Act 1956
- No. 42/1956 – Milk and Dairies (Amendment) Act 1956
- No. 43/1956 – Rent Restrictions (Continuance and Amendment) Act 1956
- No. 44/1956 – Pensions (Increase) Act 1956
- No. 45/1956 – Civil Service Commissioners Act 1956
- No. 46/1956 – Civil Service Regulation Act 1956
- No. 47/1956 – Finance (Miscellaneous Provisions) Act 1956
- No. 48/1956 – Industrial Grants Act 1956

=== 1957 ===
- No. 1/1957 – Voluntary Health Insurance Act 1957
- No. 2/1957 – Central Fund Act 1957
- No. 3/1957 – Supplies and Services (Temporary Provisions) Act 1946 (Continuance) Act 1957
- No. 4/1957 – Imposition of Duties (Confirmation of Orders) Act 1957
- No. 5/1957 – Married Women's Status Act 1957
- No. 6/1957 – Statute of Limitations, 1957
- No. 7/1957 – Imposition of Duties Act 1957
- No. 8/1957 – Social Welfare Act 1957
- No. 9/1957 – Social Welfare (Children's Allowances) Act 1957
- No. 10/1957 – Turf Development Act 1957
- No. 11/1957 – Small Dwellings Acquisition Act 1957
- No. 12/1957 – Defence Forces (Pensions) (Amendment) Act 1957
- No. 13/1957 – Industrial and Commercial Property (Protection) (Amendment) Act 1957
- No. 14/1957 – Diseases of Animals (Bovine Tuberculosis) Act 1957
- No. 15/1957 – Appropriation Act 1957
- No. 16/1957 – Health and Mental Treatment Act 1957
- No. 17/1957 – Connaught Rangers (Pensions) Act 1957
- No. 18/1957 – Bretton Woods Agreements Act 1957
- No. 19/1957 – Army Pensions Act 1957
- No. 20/1957 – Finance Act 1957
- No. 21/1957 – Social Welfare (Miscellaneous Provisions) Act 1957
- No. 22/1957 – Rent Restrictions (Continuance and Amendment) Act 1957
- No. 23/1957 – Undeveloped Areas (Amendment) Act 1957
- No. 24/1957 – Scholarship Exchange (Ireland and the United States of America) Act 1957
- No. 25/1957 – Local Loans Fund (Amendment) Act 1957
- No. 26/1957 – Gas Regulation Act 1957
- No. 27/1957 – Tourist Traffic Act 1957
- No. 28/1957 – Children (Amendment) Act 1957
- No. 29/1957 – Gaeltacht Industries Act 1957

Private Acts

- No. 1/1957 — Local Government Provisional Order Confirmation Act 1957

=== 1958 ===
- No. 1/1958 – Agriculture (An Foras Taluntais) Act 1958
- No. 2/1958 – Landlord and Tenant (Reversionary Leases) Act 1958
- No. 3/1958 – Office Premises Act 1958
- No. 4/1958 – Prices Act 1958
- No. 5/1958 – Tea (Importation and Distribution) Act 1956 (Continuance) Act 1958
- No. 6/1958 – Central Fund Act 1958
- No. 7/1958 – Imposition of Duties (Confirmation of Orders) Act 1958
- No. 8/1958 – Trustee (Authorised Investments) Act 1958
- No. 9/1958 – Local Government Act 1958
- No. 10/1958 – Industrial Credit (Amendment) Act 1958
- No. 11/1958 – Destructive Insects and Pests (Consolidation) Act 1958
- No. 12/1958 – Greyhound Industry Act 1958
- No. 13/1958 – Tea (Purchase and Importation) Act 1958
- No. 14/1958 – Garda Síochána Act 1958
- No. 15/1958 – Fisheries (Amendment) Act 1958
- No. 16/1958 – Industrial Development (Encouragement of External Investment) Act 1958
- No. 17/1958 – Agriculture (Amendment) Act 1958
- No. 18/1958 – Turf Development Act 1958
- No. 19/1958 – Transport Act 1958
- No. 20/1958 – Great Northern Railway Act 1958
- No. 21/1958 – Industrial and Commercial Property (Protection) (Amendment) Act 1958
- No. 22/1958 – International Finance Corporation Act 1958
- No. 23/1958 – Savings Banks Act 1958
- No. 24/1958 – Agricultural Produce (Cereals) (Amendment) Act 1958
- No. 25/1958 – Finance Act 1958
- No. 26/1958 – Appropriation Act 1958
- No. 27/1958 – Housing (Amendment) Act 1958
- No. 28/1958 – Finance (Miscellaneous Provisions) Act 1958
- No. 29/1958 – Customs-Free Airport (Amendment) Act 1958
- No. 30/1958 – Exchange Control (Continuance) Act 1958
- No. 31/1958 – Restrictive Trade Practices (Confirmation of Orders) Act 1958
- No. 32/1958 – Rent Restrictions (Continuance and Amendment) Act 1958
- No. 33/1958 – Control of Exports (Temporary Provisions) Act 1956 (Continuance) Act 1958
- No. 34/1958 – Civil Service Regulation (Amendment) Act 1958
- No. 35/1958 – Electricity (Supply) (Amendment) Act 1958
- No. 36/1958 – Social Welfare (Amendment) Act 1958
- No. 37/1958 – Health and Mental Treatment (Amendment) Act 1958
- No. 38/1958 – Law Reform (Personal Injuries) Act 1958

Private Acts

- No. 1/1958 – The Convalescent Home Stillorgan (Charter Amendment) Act 1958

=== 1959 ===
- No. 1/1959 – Air Navigation and Transport Act 1959
- No. 2/1959 – Turf Development Act 1959
- No. 3/1959 – Irish Shipping Limited (Amendment) Act 1959
- No. 4/1959 – Imposition of Duties (Confirmation of Orders) Act 1959
- No. 5/1959 – Referendum (Amendment) Act 1959
- No. 6/1959 – Central Fund Act 1959
- No. 7/1959 – Companies Act 1959
- No. 8/1959 – Administration of Estates Act 1959
- No. 9/1959 – Presidential Elections, (Temporary Provisions) Act 1959
- No. 10/1959 – Local Government Act 1959
- No. 11/1959 – Rates on Agricultural Land (Relief) Act 1959
- No. 12/1959 – Road Fund (Grants and Advances) (Temporary Provisions) Act 1959
- No. 13/1959 – Social Welfare Act 1959
- No. 14/1959 – Fisheries (Consolidation) Act 1959
- No. 15/1959 – Army Pensions Act 1959
- No. 16/1959 – Housing (Gaeltacht) (Amendment) Act 1959
- No. 17/1959 – Ministers and Secretaries (Amendment) Act 1959
- No. 18/1959 – Finance Act 1959
- No. 19/1959 – Cheques Act 1959
- No. 20/1959 – Export Promotion Act 1959
- No. 21/1959 – Bankers' Books Evidence (Amendment) Act 1959
- No. 22/1959 – Maritime Jurisdiction Act 1959
- No. 23/1959 – Appropriation Act 1959
- No. 24/1959 – Industrial Credit (Amendment) Act 1959
- No. 25/1959 – Grass Meal (Production) (Amendment) Act 1959
- No. 26/1959 – Industrial Grants Act 1959
- No. 27/1959 – Tourist Traffic Act 1959
- No. 28/1959 – Sea Fisheries (Amendment) Act 1959
- No. 29/1959 – Air Navigation and Transport (No. 2) Act 1959
- No. 30/1959 – Johnstown Castle Agricultural College (Amendment) Act 1959
- No. 31/1959 – Transport Act 1959
- No. 32/1959 – Funds of Suitors Act 1959
- No. 33/1959 – Electoral (Amendment) Act 1959
- No. 34/1959 – Rent Restrictions (Continuance and Amendment) Act 1959
- No. 35/1959 – Courts of Justice Act 1959
- No. 36/1959 – Shannon Free Airport Development Company Limited Act 1959
- No. 37/1959 – Restrictive Trade Practices (Amendment) Act 1959
- No. 38/1959 – Staff of the Houses of the Oireachtas Act 1959
- No. 39/1959 – Apprenticeship Act 1959
- No. 40/1959 – Transport (No. 2) Act 1959
- No. 41/1959 – Comptroller and Auditor General (Amendment) Act 1959
- No. 42/1959 – Finance (No. 2) Act 1959
- No. 43/1959 – Pensions (Increase) Act 1959

Private Acts

- No. 1/1959 – Local Government Provisional Order Confirmation Act 1959

== 1960–1969 ==
=== 1960 ===
- No. 1/1960 – Finance (Excise Duties) (Vehicles) (Amendment) Act 1960
- No. 2/1960 – Army Pensions Act 1960
- No. 3/1960 – Military Service Pensions (Amendment) Act 1960
- No. 4/1960 – Connaught Rangers (Pensions) Act 1960
- No. 5/1960 – Pensions (Amendment) Act 1960
- No. 6/1960 – Macswiney (Pension) (Increase) Act 1960
- No. 7/1960 – Petroleum and Other Minerals Development Act 1960
- No. 8/1960 – Central Fund Act 1960
- No. 9/1960 – Health Authorities Act 1960
- No. 10/1960 – Broadcasting Authority Act 1960
- No. 11/1960 – Imposition of Duties (Confirmation of Orders) Act 1960
- No. 12/1960 – Oireachtas (Allowances To Members) and Ministerial and Parliamentary Offices (Amendment) Act 1960
- No. 13/1960 – Housing (Amendment) Act 1960
- No. 14/1960 – Elections Act 1960
- No. 15/1960 – Hire-Purchase (Amendment) Act 1960
- No. 16/1960 – University College Dublin Act 1960
- No. 17/1960 – Dogs (Protection of Livestock) Act 1960
- No. 18/1960 – Intoxicating Liquor Act 1960
- No. 19/1960 – Finance Act 1960
- No. 20/1960 – Restrictive Trade Practices (Confirmation of Order) Act 1960
- No. 21/1960 – Telephone Capital Act 1960
- No. 22/1960 – Defence (Amendment) Act 1960
- No. 23/1960 – Local Government Act 1960
- No. 24/1960 – Oil Burners (Standards) Act 1960
- No. 25/1960 – Social Welfare (Amendment) Act 1960
- No. 26/1960 – Diseases of Animals Act 1960
- No. 27/1960 – Criminal Justice Act 1960
- No. 28/1960 – Social Welfare (Miscellaneous Provisions) Act 1960
- No. 29/1960 – Appropriation Act 1960
- No. 30/1960 – Military Service Pensions (Increase) Act 1960
- No. 31/1960 – Pensions (Amendment) (No. 2) Act 1960
- No. 32/1960 – Irish Steel Holdings Limited Act 1960
- No. 33/1960 – Macswiney (Pension) (Increase) (No. 2) Act 1960
- No. 34/1960 – Veterinary Surgeons Act 1960
- No. 35/1960 – International Development Association Act 1960
- No. 36/1960 – Pensions (Increase) Act 1960
- No. 37/1960 – Solicitors (Amendment) Act 1960
- No. 38/1960 – Local Government (Temporary Reduction of Valuation) Act 1960
- No. 39/1960 – Army Pensions (No. 2) Act 1960
- No. 40/1960 – Local Government (No. 2) Act 1960
- No. 41/1960 – Transport Act 1960
- No. 42/1960 – Rent Restrictions Act 1960
- No. 43/1960 – Electoral Act 1960
- No. 44/1960 – Defence (Amendment) (No. 2) Act 1960
- No. 45/1960 – Property Values (Arbitrations and Appeals) Act 1960
- No. 46/1960 – Health (Fluoridation of Water Supplies) Act 1960

Private Acts

- No. 1/1960 – The Institution of Civil Engineers of Ireland (Charter Amendment) Act 1960

=== 1961 ===
- No. 1/1961 – Dairy Produce Marketing Act 1961
- No. 2/1961 – Electricity (Supply) (Amendment) Act 1961
- No. 3/1961 – Derelict Sites Act 1961
- No. 4/1961 – Mental Treatment (Detention in Approved Institutions) Act 1961
- No. 5/1961 – Connaught Rangers (Pensions) Act 1961
- No. 6/1961 – Army Pensions (Increase) Act 1961
- No. 7/1961 – Mental Treatment Act 1961
- No. 8/1961 – Central Bank Act 1961
- No. 9/1961 – Central Fund Act 1961
- No. 10/1961 – Imposition of Duties (Confirmation of Orders) Act 1961
- No. 11/1961 – Juries Act 1961
- No. 12/1961 – Poisons Act 1961
- No. 13/1961 – Agricultural Credit Act 1961
- No. 14/1961 – Pigs and Bacon (Amendment) Act 1961
- No. 15/1961 – Agricultural Produce (Eggs) Act 1961
- No. 16/1961 – Courts of Justice and Court Officers (Superannuation) Act 1961
- No. 17/1961 – Charities Act 1961
- No. 18/1961 – Nurses Act 1961
- No. 19/1961 – Electoral (Amendment) Act 1961
- No. 20/1961 – Industrial Research and Standards Act 1961
- No. 21/1961 – Hospitals Federation and Amalgamation Act 1961
- No. 22/1961 – Social Welfare (Miscellaneous Provisions) Act 1961
- No. 23/1961 – Finance Act 1961
- No. 24/1961 – Road Traffic Act 1961
- No. 25/1961 – Air Navigation and Transport Act 1961
- No. 26/1961 – Medical Practitioners Act 1961
- No. 27/1961 – Health (Corporate Bodies) Act 1961
- No. 28/1961 – Insurance Act 1961
- No. 29/1961 – Appropriation Act 1961
- No. 30/1961 – Industrial Grants (Amendment) Act 1961
- No. 31/1961 – Shannon Free Airport Development Company Limited (Amendment) Act 1961
- No. 32/1961 – Milk (Regulation of Supply and Price) (Amendment) Act 1961
- No. 33/1961 – Holidays (Employees) Act 1961
- No. 34/1961 – Local Authorities (Education Scholarships) (Amendment) Act 1961
- No. 35/1961 – Curragh of Kildare Act 1961
- No. 36/1961 – Agricultural Workers (Holidays) (Amendment) Act 1961
- No. 37/1961 – Tourist Traffic Act 1961
- No. 38/1961 – Courts (Establishment and Constitution) Act 1961
- No. 39/1961 – Courts (Supplemental Provisions) Act 1961
- No. 40/1961 – Defamation Act 1961
- No. 41/1961 – Civil Liability Act 1961
- No. 42/1961 – Electricity (Temporary Provisions) Act 1961
- No. 43/1961 – Control of Exports (Temporary Provisions) Act 1956 (Continuance) Act 1961
- No. 44/1961 – Foyle Fisheries (Amendment) Act 1961
- No. 45/1961 – Local Loans Fund (Amendment) Act 1961
- No. 46/1961 – Turf Development Act 1961
- No. 47/1961 – Agricultural Produce (Cereals) Act 1961

Private Acts

- No. 1/1961 – The Iveagh Trust (Amendment) Act 1961

=== 1962 ===
- No. 1/1962 – Garda Síochána Act 1962
- No. 2/1962 – Pilotage (Amendment) Act 1962
- No. 3/1962 – Road Fund (Grants) (Temporary Provisions) Act 1962
- No. 4/1962 – Cement (Amendment) Act 1962
- No. 5/1962 – Short Titles Act 1962
- No. 6/1962 – Central Fund Act 1962
- No. 7/1962 – Royal Hospital Kilmainham Act 1962
- No. 8/1962 – State Lands (Workhouses) Act 1962
- No. 9/1962 – Coroners Act 1962
- No. 10/1962 – Imposition of Duties (Confirmation of Orders) Act 1962
- No. 11/1962 – Geneva Conventions Act 1962
- No. 12/1962 – Criminal Justice (Legal Aid) Act 1962
- No. 13/1962 – Street and House To House Collections Act 1962
- No. 14/1962 – Pharmacy Act 1962
- No. 15/1962 – Finance Act 1962
- No. 16/1962 – Restrictive Trade Practices (Confirmation of Orders) Act 1962
- No. 17/1962 – Social Welfare (Miscellaneous Provisions) Act 1962
- No. 18/1962 – Courts (Supplemental Provisions) (Amendment) Act 1962
- No. 19/1962 – Appropriation Act 1962
- No. 20/1962 – Restriction of Imports Act 1962
- No. 21/1962 – Intoxicating Liquor Act 1962
- No. 22/1962 – Army Pensions Act 1962
- No. 23/1962 – Rates on Agricultural Land (Relief) Act 1962
- No. 24/1962 – Electricity (Supply) (Amendment) Act 1962
- No. 25/1962 – State Guarantees (Transport) Act 1962
- No. 26/1962 – Local Government (Sanitary Services) Act 1962
- No. 27/1962 – Housing (Loans and Grants) Act 1962
- No. 28/1962 – Vocational Education (Amendment) Act 1962
- No. 29/1962 – Statute Law Revision (Pre-Union Irish Statutes) Act 1962
- No. 30/1962 – Restrictive Trade Practices (Confirmation of Order) (No. 2) Act 1962
- No. 31/1962 – Fisheries (Amendment) Act 1962
- No. 32/1962 – Oireachtas (Allowances To Members) Act 1962
- No. 33/1962 – Military Service Pensions (Increase) Act 1962
- No. 34/1962 – Army Pensions (Increase) Act 1962
- No. 35/1962 – Connaught Rangers (Pensions) Act 1962
- No. 36/1962 – Macswiney (Pension) (Increase) Act 1962
- No. 37/1962 – Sugar Manufacture (Amendment) Act 1962
- No. 38/1962 – Exchange Control (Continuance) Act 1962

=== 1963 ===
- No. 1/1963 – Official Secrets Act 1963
- No. 2/1963 – Nítrigin Éireann Teoranta Act 1963
- No. 3/1963 – Undeveloped Areas (Amendment) Act 1963
- No. 4/1963 – Industrial Grants (Amendment) Act 1963
- No. 5/1963 – National Gallery of Ireland Act 1963
- No. 6/1963 – Restrictive Trade Practices (Confirmation of Order) Act 1963
- No. 7/1963 – Hotel Proprietors Act 1963
- No. 8/1963 – Central Fund Act 1963
- No. 9/1963 – Trade Marks Act 1963
- No. 10/1963 – Copyright Act 1963
- No. 11/1963 – Irish Steel Holdings Limited (Amendment) Act 1963
- No. 12/1963 – Coast Protection Act 1963
- No. 13/1963 – Control of Imports (Amendment) Act 1963
- No. 14/1963 – Electricity (Supply) (Amendment) Act 1963
- No. 15/1963 – Air Navigation (Eurocontrol) Act 1963
- No. 16/1963 – Taiscí Stáit Teoranta Act 1963
- No. 17/1963 – Transport Act 1963
- No. 18/1963 – Local Government (Temporary Reduction of Valuation) Act 1963
- No. 19/1963 – Electoral Act 1963
- No. 20/1963 – Export Promotion (Amendment) Act 1963
- No. 21/1963 – Sea Fisheries (Amendment) Act 1963
- No. 22/1963 – Tourist Traffic Act 1963
- No. 23/1963 – Finance Act 1963
- No. 24/1963 – Superannuation and Pensions Act 1963
- No. 25/1963 – Appropriation Act 1963
- No. 26/1963 – Social Welfare (Miscellaneous Provisions) Act 1963
- No. 27/1963 – Shannon Free Airport Development Company Limited (Amendment) Act 1963
- No. 28/1963 – Local Government (Planning and Development) Act 1963
- No. 29/1963 – Imposition of Duties (Confirmation of Orders) Act 1963
- No. 30/1963 – Registration of Business Names Act 1963
- No. 31/1963 – Telephone Capital Act 1963
- No. 32/1963 – National Building Agency Limited Act 1963
- No. 33/1963 – Companies Act 1963
- No. 34/1963 – Stock Transfer Act 1963
- No. 35/1963 – Funds of Suitors Act 1963

Private Acts

- No. 1/1963 – The Limerick Harbour (Bridge) Act 1963

=== 1964 ===
- No. 1/1964 – Firearms Act 1964
- No. 2/1964 – Adoption Act 1964
- No. 3/1964 – Central Bank Act 1964
- No. 4/1964 – Broadcasting Authority (Amendment) Act 1964
- No. 5/1964 – Criminal Justice Act 1964
- No. 6/1964 – Central Fund Act 1964
- No. 7/1964 – Guardianship of Infants Act 1964
- No. 8/1964 – Health (Homes For Incapacitated Persons) Act 1964
- No. 9/1964 – Courts (Supplemental Provisions) (Amendment) Act 1964
- No. 10/1964 – Pensions (Increase) Act 1964
- No. 11/1964 – Courts Act 1964
- No. 12/1964 – Patents Act 1964
- No. 13/1964 – Land Bond Act 1964
- No. 14/1964 – Oireachtas (Allowances To Members) and Ministerial and Parliamentary Offices (Amendment) Act 1964
- No. 15/1964 – Finance Act 1964
- No. 16/1964 – Registration of Title Act 1964
- No. 17/1964 – Civil Liability (Amendment) Act 1964
- No. 18/1964 – Insurance Act 1964
- No. 19/1964 – Agriculture (Amendment) Act 1964
- No. 20/1964 – Control of Imports (Amendment) Act 1964
- No. 21/1964 – Appropriation Act 1964
- No. 22/1964 – Comptroller and Auditor General (Amendment) Act 1964
- No. 23/1964 – Fisheries (Amendment) Act 1964
- No. 24/1964 – Macswiney (Pension) (Increase) Act 1964
- No. 25/1964 – Military Service Pensions (Increase) Act 1964
- No. 26/1964 – Connaught Rangers (Pensions) Act 1964
- No. 27/1964 – Army Pensions (Increase) Act 1964
- No. 28/1964 – Social Welfare (Miscellaneous Provisions) Act 1964
- No. 29/1964 – Local Government (Sanitary Services) Act 1964
- No. 30/1964 – Transport Act 1964
- No. 31/1964 – Pawnbrokers Act 1964
- No. 32/1964 – Maritime Jurisdiction (Amendment) Act 1964
- No. 33/1964 – Local Government (Repeal of Enactments) Act 1964
- No. 34/1964 – Housing (Gaeltacht) (Amendment) Act 1964
- No. 35/1964 – Rates on Agricultural Land (Relief) Act 1964
- No. 36/1964 – State Guarantees (Amendment) Act 1964
- No. 37/1964 – Industrial Grants (Amendment) Act 1964
- No. 38/1964 – Local Loans Fund (Amendment) Act 1964
- No. 39/1964 – Imposition of Duties (Confirmation of Orders) Act 1964
- No. 40/1964 – Control of Manufactures Act 1964

Private Acts

- No. 1/1964 – The Waterford Harbour Commissioners (Acquisition of Property) Act 1964

=== 1965 ===
- No. 1/1965 – Oil Pollution of the Sea (Amendment) Act 1965
- No. 2/1965 – Land Act 1965
- No. 3/1965 – Control of Exports (Temporary Provisions) Act 1956 (Continuance) Act 1965
- No. 4/1965 – Central Fund Act 1965
- No. 5/1965 – British & Irish Steam Packet Company Limited (Acquisition) Act 1965
- No. 6/1965 – Air Navigation and Transport Act 1965
- No. 7/1965 – Mines and Quarries Act 1965
- No. 8/1965 – Cork City Management (Amendment) Act 1965
- No. 9/1965 – Turf Development Act 1965
- No. 10/1965 – Protection of Animals (Amendment) Act 1965
- No. 11/1965 – Trustee Savings Banks Act 1965
- No. 12/1965 – Agricultural Credit Act 1965
- No. 13/1965 – Pensions (Abatement) Act 1965
- No. 14/1965 – Shannon Free Airport Development Company Limited (Amendment) Act 1965
- No. 15/1965 – Electricity (Supply) (Amendment) Act 1965
- No. 16/1965 – Imposition of Duties (Confirmation of Orders) Act 1965
- No. 17/1965 – Extradition Act 1965
- No. 18/1965 – Gaeltacht Industries (Amendment) Act 1965
- No. 19/1965 – Local Elections Act 1965
- No. 20/1965 – Social Welfare (Miscellaneous Provisions) Act 1965
- No. 21/1965 – Appropriation Act 1965
- No. 22/1965 – Finance Act 1965
- No. 23/1965 – Prices (Amendment) Act 1965
- No. 24/1965 – Labourers Act 1965
- No. 25/1965 – State Guarantees (Transport) (Amendment) Act 1965
- No. 26/1965 – Central Fund (Permanent Provisions) Act 1965
- No. 27/1965 – Succession Act 1965

Private Acts

- No. 1/1965 – The Royal, College of Surgeons in Ireland (Charter Amendment) Act 1965
- No. 2/1965 – Local Government Provisional Order Confirmation Act 1965

=== 1966 ===
- No. 1/1966 – Electoral (Amendment) Act 1966
- No. 2/1966 – Health and Mental Treatment (Amendment) Act 1966
- No. 3/1966 – Tourist Traffic Act 1966
- No. 4/1966 – Air Companies Act 1966
- No. 5/1966 – Coinage (Amendment) Act 1966
- No. 6/1966 – Diseases of Animals Act 1966
- No. 7/1966 – Broadcasting Authority (Amendment) Act 1966
- No. 8/1966 – National Bank Transfer Act 1966
- No. 9/1966 – Patents (Amendment) Act 1966
- No. 10/1966 – Houses of the Oireachtas (Laying of Documents) Act 1966
- No. 11/1966 – Restrictive Trade Practices (Confirmation of Order) Act 1966
- No. 12/1966 – Industrial Grants (Amendment) Act 1966
- No. 13/1966 – Electricity (Special Provisions) Act 1966
- No. 14/1966 – Tea (Purchase and Importation) (Amendment) Act 1966
- No. 15/1966 – Local Government (Reduction of Valuation) Act 1966
- No. 16/1966 – Social Welfare (Occupational Injuries) Act 1966
- No. 17/1966 – Finance Act 1966
- No. 18/1966 – Ministers and Secretaries (Amendment) Act 1966
- No. 19/1966 – Credit Union Act 1966
- No. 20/1966 – Merchant Shipping Act 1966
- No. 21/1966 – Housing Act 1966
- No. 22/1966 – Finance (No. 2) Act 1966
- No. 23/1966 – Imports (Miscellaneous Provisions) Act 1966
- No. 24/1966 – Social Welfare (Miscellaneous Provisions) Act 1966
- No. 25/1966 – Funds of Suitors Act 1966
- No. 26/1966 – Transport Act 1966
- No. 27/1966 – Exchange Control (Continuance) Act 1966
- No. 28/1966 – Local Elections Act 1966
- No. 29/1966 – Appropriation Act 1966

Private Acts

- No. 1/1966 – Local Government Provisional Order Confirmation Act 1966
- No. 2/1966 – The Institute of Chartered Accountants in Ireland (Charter Amendment) Act 1966
- No. 3/1966 – The Huguenot Cemetery Dublin (Peter Street) Act 1966

=== 1967 ===
- No. 1/1967 – Export Promotion (Amendment) Act 1967
- No. 2/1967 – Institute For Advanced Studies (Amendment) Act 1967
- No. 3/1967 – Landlord and Tenant (Ground Rents) Act 1967
- No. 4/1967 – Local Government (Dublin) Act 1967
- No. 5/1967 – Industrial Training Act 1967
- No. 6/1967 – Income Tax Act 1967
- No. 7/1967 – Income Tax (Amendment) Act 1967
- No. 8/1967 – Diplomatic Relations and Immunities Act 1967
- No. 9/1967 – Auctioneers and House Agents Act 1967
- No. 10/1967 – Rent Restrictions (Amendment) Act 1967
- No. 11/1967 – Air Companies (Amendment) Act 1967
- No. 12/1967 – Criminal Procedure Act 1967
- No. 13/1967 – Rates on Agricultural Land (Relief) Act 1967
- No. 14/1967 – Agriculture (Amendment) Act 1967
- No. 15/1967 – Censorship of Publications Act 1967
- No. 16/1967 – Housing (Gaeltacht) (Amendment) Act 1967
- No. 17/1967 – Finance Act 1967
- No. 18/1967 – Social Welfare (Miscellaneous Provisions) Act 1967
- No. 19/1967 – School Attendance (Amendment) Act 1967
- No. 20/1967 – Livestock Marts Act 1967
- No. 21/1967 – Redundancy Payments Act 1967
- No. 22/1967 – Milk (Regulation of Supply and Price) (Amendment) Act 1967
- No. 23/1967 – Appropriation Act 1967

=== 1968 ===
- No. 1/1968 – Industrial Grants (Amendment) Act 1968
- No. 2/1968 – Local Government (Buncrana) Act 1968
- No. 3/1968 – Courts (Supplemental Provisions) (Amendment) Act 1968
- No. 4/1968 – Defence Forces (Pensions) (Amendment) Act 1968
- No. 5/1968 – Smelting Act 1968
- No. 6/1968 – Local Government (Roads and Drainage) Act 1968
- No. 7/1968 – Finance (Miscellaneous Provisions) Act 1968
- No. 8/1968 – Oireachtas (Allowances To Members) (Amendment) Act 1968
- No. 9/1968 – Control of Exports (Temporary Provisions) Act 1956 (Continuance) Act 1968
- No. 10/1968 – Chester Beatty Library Act 1968
- No. 11/1968 – Imposition of Duties (Dumping and Subsidies) Act 1968
- No. 12/1968 – Army Pensions Act 1968
- No. 13/1968 – Shannon Free Airport Development Company Limited (Amendment) Act 1968
- No. 14/1968 – Continental Shelf Act 1968
- No. 15/1968 – Motor Vehicles (Registration of Importers) Act 1968
- No. 16/1968 – Industrial Grants (Amendment) (No. 2) Act 1968
- No. 17/1968 – Merchant Shipping (Load Lines) Act 1968
- No. 18/1968 – Fishery Harbour Centres Act 1968
- No. 19/1968 – Performers' Protection Act 1968
- No. 20/1968 – Firearms (Proofing) Act 1968
- No. 21/1968 – Courts (Supplemental Provisions) (Amendment) (No. 2) Act 1968
- No. 22/1968 – Oireachtas (Allowances To Members) and Ministerial and Parliamentary Offices (Amendment) Act 1968
- No. 23/1968 – Standard Time Act 1968
- No. 24/1968 – Local Authorities (Higher Education Grants) Act 1968
- No. 25/1968 – Road Traffic Act 1968
- No. 26/1968 – Wool Marketing Act 1968
- No. 27/1968 – Local Loans Fund (Amendment) Act 1968
- No. 28/1968 – Turf Development Act 1968
- No. 29/1968 – Tourist Traffic Act 1968
- No. 30/1968 – Gaeltacht Industries (Amendment) Act 1968
- No. 31/1968 – Social Welfare (Miscellaneous Provisions) Act 1968
- No. 32/1968 – Electricity (Supply) (Amendment) Act 1968
- No. 33/1968 – Finance Act 1968
- No. 34/1968 – Referendum (Amendment) Act 1968
- No. 35/1968 – Broadcasting (Offences) Act 1968
- No. 36/1968 – Appropriation Act 1968
- No. 37/1968 – Finance (No. 2) Act 1968
- No. 38/1968 – Imposition of Duties (Confirmation of Orders) Act 1968

=== 1969 ===
- No. 1/1969 – Agricultural Produce (Cereals) (Amendment) Act 1969
- No. 2/1969 – Telephone Capital Act 1969
- No. 3/1969 – Electoral (Amendment) Act 1969
- No. 4/1969 – Export Promotion (Amendment) Act 1969
- No. 5/1969 – Insurance Act 1969
- No. 6/1969 – Agricultural Credit Act 1969
- No. 7/1969 – Holycross Abbey (County Tipperary) Act 1969
- No. 8/1969 – Industrial Grants (Amendment) Act 1969
- No. 9/1969 – Nelson Pillar Act 1969
- No. 10/1969 – Bretton Woods Agreements (Amendment) Act 1969
- No. 11/1969 – Shipping Investment Grants Act 1969
- No. 12/1969 – Electricity (Special Provisions) (Repeal) Act 1969
- No. 13/1969 – Curragh of Kildare Act 1969
- No. 14/1969 – Industrial Relations Act 1969
- No. 15/1969 – Collection of Taxes (Confirmation) Act 1969
- No. 16/1969 – Housing Act 1969
- No. 17/1969 – Agricultural Workers (Holidays and Wages) Act 1969
- No. 18/1969 – Post Office (Amendment) Act 1969
- No. 19/1969 – Social Welfare (Miscellaneous Provisions) Act 1969
- No. 20/1969 – Air Companies (Amendment) Act 1969
- No. 21/1969 – Finance Act 1969
- No. 22/1969 – Grass Meal (Production) (Amendment) Act 1969
- No. 23/1969 – Decimal Currency Act 1969
- No. 24/1969 – Land Bond Act 1969
- No. 25/1969 – National Stud Act 1969
- No. 26/1969 – National University of Ireland Act 1969
- No. 27/1969 – National Building Agency Limited (Amendment) Act 1969
- No. 28/1969 – Restrictive Trade Practices (Confirmation of Order) Act 1969
- No. 29/1969 – Immature Spirits (Restriction) Act 1969
- No. 30/1969 – Appropriation Act 1969
- No. 31/1969 – Transport Act 1969
- No. 32/1969 – Industrial Development Act 1969
- No. 33/1969 – Imposition of Duties (Confirmation of Orders) Act 1969

Private Acts

- No. 1/1969 – The Institution of Civil Engineers of Ireland (Charter Amendment) Act 1969

== 1970–1979 ==
=== 1970 ===
- No. 1/1970 – Health Act 1970
- No. 2/1970 – Local Government (Rates) Act 1970
- No. 3/1970 – Agriculture (Amendment) Act 1970
- No. 4/1970 – Nítrigin Éireann Teoranta Act 1970
- No. 5/1970 – Electricity (Supply) (Amendment) Act 1970
- No. 6/1970 – Gaming and Lotteries Act 1970
- No. 7/1970 – Censorship of Films (Amendment) Act 1970
- No. 8/1970 – Sea Fisheries (Amendment) Act 1970
- No. 9/1970 – Shannon Free Airport Development Company Limited (Amendment) Act 1970
- No. 10/1970 – Merchandise Marks Act 1970
- No. 11/1970 – Prisons Act 1970
- No. 12/1970 – Social Welfare Act 1970
- No. 13/1970 – Local Government (Temporary Reduction of Valuation) Act 1970
- No. 14/1970 – Finance Act 1970
- No. 15/1970 – Vocational Education (Amendment) Act 1970
- No. 16/1970 – Tourist Traffic Act 1970
- No. 17/1970 – Imposition of Duties (Confirmation of Orders) Act 1970
- No. 18/1970 – Housing Act 1970
- No. 19/1970 – Horse Industry Act 1970
- No. 20/1970 – Appropriation Act 1970
- No. 21/1970 – Decimal Currency Act 1970
- No. 22/1970 – Committee of Public Accounts of Dáil Éireann (Privilege and Procedure) Act 1970
- No. 23/1970 – Exchange Control (Continuance) Act 1970
- No. 24/1970 – Transport Act 1970
- No. 25/1970 – Finance (No. 2) Act 1970

Private Acts

- No. 1/1970 – The Dublin Cemeteries Committee Act 1970

=== 1971 ===
- No. 1/1971 – International Health Bodies (Corporate Status) Act 1971
- No. 2/1971 – Broadcasting Authority (Amendment) Act 1971
- No. 3/1971 – Fuels (Control of Supplies) Act 1971
- No. 4/1971 – Irish Steel Holdings Limited (Amendment) Act 1971
- No. 5/1971 – Control of Exports (Temporary Provisions) Act 1956 (Continuance) Act 1971
- No. 6/1971 – Local Government Services (Corporate Bodies) Act 1971
- No. 7/1971 – Gaeltacht Industries (Amendment) Act 1971
- No. 8/1971 – Road Transport Act 1971
- No. 9/1971 – Industrial Credit (Amendment) Act 1971
- No. 10/1971 – Insurance Act 1971
- No. 11/1971 – British & Irish Steam Packet Company Limited (Acquisition) (Amendment) Act 1971
- No. 12/1971 – Nuclear Energy (An Bord Fuinnimh Nuicleigh) Act 1971
- No. 13/1971 – Firearms Act 1971
- No. 14/1971 – Transport (Miscellaneous Provisions) Act 1971
- No. 15/1971 – Local Government (Rateability of Rents) (Abolition) Act 1971
- No. 16/1971 – Social Welfare Act 1971
- No. 17/1971 – Standard Time (Amendment) Act 1971
- No. 18/1971 – Electricity (Supply) (Amendment) Act 1971
- No. 19/1971 – Air Navigation (Eurocontrol) Act 1971
- No. 20/1971 – Redundancy Payments Act 1971
- No. 21/1971 – Health Contributions Act 1971
- No. 22/1971 – Higher Education Authority Act 1971
- No. 23/1971 – Finance Act 1971
- No. 24/1971 – Central Bank Act 1971
- No. 25/1971 – Prohibition of Forcible Entry and Occupation Act 1971
- No. 26/1971 – Army Pensions Act 1971
- No. 27/1971 – Employment Agency Act 1971
- No. 28/1971 – National College of Art and Design Act 1971
- No. 29/1971 – Imposition of Duties (Confirmation of Orders) Act 1971
- No. 30/1971 – Landlord and Tenant (Amendment) Act 1971
- No. 31/1971 – Industrial and Provident Societies (Amendment) Act 1971
- No. 32/1971 – Agriculture (Amendment) Act 1971
- No. 33/1971 – Trade Union Act 1971
- No. 34/1971 – Export Promotion (Amendment) Act 1971
- No. 35/1971 – International Development Association (Amendment) Act 1971
- No. 36/1971 – Courts Act 1971
- No. 37/1971 – Appropriation Act 1971

=== 1972 ===
- No. 1/1972 – Foir Teoranta Act 1972
- No. 2/1972 – Garda Síochána Act 1972
- No. 3/1972 – Agricultural Credit Act 1972
- No. 4/1972 – Electoral (Amendment) Act 1972
- No. 5/1972 – Wireless Telegraphy Act 1972
- No. 6/1972 – Court Officers Act 1972
- No. 7/1972 – Prisons Act 1972
- No. 8/1972 – Restrictive Trade Practices (Confirmation of Orders) Act 1972
- No. 9/1972 – Industrial Development Act 1972
- No. 10/1972 – Dangerous Substances Act 1972
- No. 11/1972 – Restrictive Practices Act 1972
- No. 12/1972 – Local Elections Act 1972
- No. 13/1972 – Rates on Agricultural Land (Relief) Act 1972
- No. 14/1972 – Local Loans Fund (Amendment) Act 1972
- No. 15/1972 – Social Welfare Act 1972
- No. 16/1972 – Immature Spirits (Restrictions) Act 1972
- No. 17/1972 – Unit Trusts Act 1972
- No. 18/1972 – Restrictive Trade Practices (Confirmation of Order) Act 1972
- No. 19/1972 – Finance Act 1972
- No. 20/1972 – Prices (Amendment) Act 1972
- No. 21/1972 – Ministerial and Parliamentary Offices Act 1972
- No. 22/1972 – Value-Added Tax Act 1972
- No. 23/1972 – Referendum (Amendment) Act 1972
- No. 24/1972 – Electricity (Supply) (Amendment) Act 1972
- No. 25/1972 – Births, Deaths and Marriages Registration Act 1972
- No. 26/1972 – Offences Against the State (Amendment) Act 1972
- No. 27/1972 – European Communities Act 1972
- No. 28/1972 – Tourist Traffic Act 1972
- No. 29/1972 – Imposition of Duties (Confirmation of Orders) Act 1972
- No. 30/1972 – Marriages Act 1972
- No. 31/1972 – Appropriation Act 1972
- No. 32/1972 – County Management (Amendment) Act 1972

Constitutional Amendments

- Third Amendment of the Constitution Act 1972
- Fourth Amendment of the Constitution Act 1972
- Fifth Amendment of the Constitution Act 1972

=== 1973 ===
- No. 1/1973 – Broadcasting Authority (Amendment) Act 1973
- No. 2/1973 – Social Welfare (Pay-Related Benefit) Act 1973
- No. 3/1973 – Electoral (Amendment) Act 1973
- No. 4/1973 – Minimum Notice and Terms of Employment Act 1973
- No. 5/1973 – European Communities (Confirmation of Regulations) Act 1973
- No. 6/1973 – Sugar Manufacture (Amendment) Act 1973
- No. 7/1973 – Local Elections Act 1973
- No. 8/1973 – Local Government (Rates) Act 1973
- No. 9/1973 – Foir Teoranta (Amendment) Act 1973
- No. 10/1973 – Social Welfare Act 1973
- No. 11/1973 – Redundancy Payments Act 1973
- No. 12/1973 – Regulation of Banks (Remuneration and Conditions of Employment) (Temporary Provisions) Act 1973
- No. 13/1973 – Charities Act 1973
- No. 14/1973 – Ministers and Secretaries (Amendment) Act 1973
- No. 15/1973 – Road Traffic (Amendment) Act 1973
- No. 16/1973 – Criminal Procedure (Amendment) Act 1973
- No. 17/1973 – Civil Service (Employment of Married Women) Act 1973
- No. 18/1973 – Presidential Establishment (Amendment) Act 1973
- No. 19/1973 – Finance Act 1973
- No. 20/1973 – European Communities (Amendment) Act 1973
- No. 21/1973 – Dairy Produce (Miscellaneous Provision) Act 1973
- No. 22/1973 – Oireachtas (Allowances To Members) and Ministerial and Parliamentary Offices (Amendment) Act 1973
- No. 23/1973 – Auctioneers and House Agents Act 1973
- No. 24/1973 – Place-Names (Irish Forms) Act 1973
- No. 25/1973 – Holidays (Employees) Act 1973
- No. 26/1973 – Courts Act 1973
- No. 27/1973 – Army Pensions Act 1973
- No. 28/1973 – Genocide Act 1973
- No. 29/1973 – Air Navigation and Transport Act 1973
- No. 30/1973 – International Development Association (Amendment) Act 1973
- No. 31/1973 – Agricultural Credit Act 1973
- No. 32/1973 – Telephone Capital Act 1973
- No. 33/1973 – Arts Act 1973
- No. 34/1973 – Appropriation Act 1973

=== 1974 ===
- No. 1/1974 – Transport Act 1974
- No. 2/1974 – National Building Agency Limited (Amendment) Act 1974
- No. 3/1974 – Exchequer and Local Financial Years Act 1974
- No. 4/1974 – Restrictive Practices (Confirmation of Orders) Act 1974
- No. 5/1974 – Control of Exports (Temporary Provisions) Act 1956 (Continuance) Act 1974
- No. 6/1974 – Local Government (Roads and Motorways) Act 1974
- No. 7/1974 – Electoral (Amendment) Act 1974
- No. 8/1974 – Local Elections (Petitions and Disqualifications) Act 1974
- No. 9/1974 – Building Societies Act 1974
- No. 10/1974 – Prisons Act 1974
- No. 11/1974 – Food Standards Act 1974
- No. 12/1974 – Social Welfare Act 1974
- No. 13/1974 – Gaeltacht Industries (Amendment) Act 1974
- No. 14/1974 – Social Welfare (No. 2) Act 1974
- No. 15/1974 – Anti-Discrimination (Pay) Act 1974
- No. 16/1974 – Maintenance Orders Act 1974
- No. 17/1974 – Finance (Taxation of Profits of Certain Mines) Act 1974
- No. 18/1974 – Export Promotion (Amendment) Act 1974
- No. 19/1974 – Electricity (Supply) (Amendment) Act 1974
- No. 20/1974 – Industrial Credit (Amendment) Act 1974
- No. 21/1974 – Shannon Free Airport Development Company Limited (Amendment) Act 1974
- No. 22/1974 – Prosecution of Offences Act 1974
- No. 23/1974 – Agriculture (Amendment) Act 1974
- No. 24/1974 – Adoption Act 1974
- No. 25/1974 – Fisheries (Amendment) Act 1974
- No. 26/1974 – Exchange Control (Continuance) Act 1974
- No. 27/1974 – Finance Act 1974
- No. 28/1974 – Local Loans Fund (Amendment) Act 1974
- No. 29/1974 – Rates on Agricultural Land (Relief) Act 1974
- No. 30/1974 – Sea Fisheries (Amendment) Act 1974
- No. 31/1974 – Social Welfare (No. 3) Act 1974
- No. 32/1974 – Health Contributions (Amendment) Act 1974
- No. 33/1974 – Broadcasting Authority (Amendment) Act 1974
- No. 34/1974 – Transport (No. 2) Act 1974
- No. 35/1974 – Appropriation Act 1974

Private Acts

- No. 1/1974 – The Leopardstown Park Hospital (Trust Deed Amendment) Act 1974

=== 1975 ===
- No. 1/1975 – Social Welfare Act 1975
- No. 2/1975 – Defence Forces (Pensions) (Amendment) Act 1975
- No. 3/1975 – Law Reform Commission Act 1975
- No. 4/1975 – Trade Union Act 1975
- No. 5/1975 – Land Bond Act 1975
- No. 6/1975 – Finance Act 1975
- No. 7/1975 – Agricultural Workers (Holidays) (Amendment) Act 1975
- No. 8/1975 – Social Welfare (Pay-Related Benefit) Act 1975
- No. 9/1975 – Air Navigation and Transport Act 1975
- No. 10/1975 – Restricted Licences Conversion Fund Act 1975
- No. 11/1975 – Racing Board and Racecourses (Amendment) Act 1975
- No. 12/1975 – Court of Justice of the European Communities (Perjury) Act 1975
- No. 13/1975 – Appropriation Act 1975
- No. 14/1975 – Local Authorities (Traffic Wardens) Act 1975
- No. 15/1975 – Restrictive Practices (Confirmation of Order) Act 1975
- No. 16/1975 – Industrial Development Act 1975
- No. 17/1975 – Agricultural Credit Act 1975
- No. 18/1975 – Gaeltacht Industries (Amendment) Act 1975
- No. 19/1975 – Finance (No. 2) Act 1975
- No. 20/1975 – Capital Gains Tax Act 1975
- No. 21/1975 – Air Navigation and Transport (No. 2) Act 1975
- No. 22/1975 – Turf Development Act 1975
- No. 23/1975 – Employment Premium Act 1975
- No. 24/1975 – Nítrigin Éireann Teoranta Act 1975
- No. 25/1975 – Wealth Tax Act 1975
- No. 26/1975 – Tourist Traffic Act 1975
- No. 27/1975 – Regulation of Banks (Remuneration and Conditions of Employment) (Temporary Provisions) Act 1975
- No. 28/1975 – Social Welfare (Supplementary Welfare Allowances) Act 1975
- No. 29/1975 – Industrial Development (No. 2) Act 1975

=== 1976 ===
- No. 1/1976 – ACP-EEC Convention of Lome (Contracts of Guarantee Between State and European Investment Bank) Act 1976
- No. 2/1976 – Diplomatic Relations and Immunities (Amendment) Act 1976
- No. 3/1976 – Rates on Agricultural Land (Relief) Act 1976
- No. 4/1976 – Juries Act 1976
- No. 5/1976 – Harbours Act 1976
- No. 6/1976 – Social Welfare Act 1976
- No. 7/1976 – Corporation Tax Act 1976
- No. 8/1976 – Capital Acquisitions Tax Act 1976
- No. 9/1976 – Health Contributions (Amendment) Act 1976
- No. 10/1976 – Committees of the Houses of the Oireachtas (Privilege and Procedure) Act 1976
- No. 11/1976 – Family Law (Maintenance of Spouses and Children) Act 1976
- No. 12/1976 – British & Irish Steam Packet Company Limited (Acquisition) (Amendment) Act 1976
- No. 13/1976 – Foyle Fisheries (Amendment) Act 1976
- No. 14/1976 – Criminal Law (Jurisdiction) Act 1976
- No. 15/1976 – Industrial Relations Act 1976
- No. 16/1976 – Finance Act 1976
- No. 17/1976 – Public Hospitals (Amendment) Act 1976
- No. 18/1976 – Regulation of Banks (Remuneration and Conditions of Employment) (Temporary Provisions) Act 1976
- No. 19/1976 – Dairy Produce (Miscellaneous Provisions) (Amendment) Act 1976
- No. 20/1976 – Local Government (Planning and Development) Act 1976
- No. 21/1976 – Organisation For Economic Co-Operation and Development (Financial Support Fund) (Agreement) Act 1976
- No. 22/1976 – Superannuation and Pensions Act 1976
- No. 23/1976 – Fisheries (Amendment) Act 1976
- No. 24/1976 – Employment Premium Act 1976
- No. 25/1976 – Foir Teoranta (Amendment) Act 1976
- No. 26/1976 – National Stud Act 1976
- No. 27/1976 – Family Home Protection Act 1976
- No. 28/1976 – Social Welfare (No. 2) Act 1976
- No. 29/1976 – Adoption Act 1976
- No. 30/1976 – Gas Act 1976
- No. 31/1976 – Appropriation Act 1976
- No. 32/1976 – Criminal Law Act 1976
- No. 33/1976 – Emergency Powers Act 1976
- No. 34/1976 – Criminal Justice (Verdicts) Act 1976
- No. 35/1976 – Electricity (Supply) (Amendment) Act 1976
- No. 36/1976 – Air Companies (Amendment) Act 1976
- No. 37/1976 – Broadcasting Authority (Amendment) Act 1976
- No. 38/1976 – Building Societies Act 1976
- No. 39/1976 – Wildlife Act 1976

Private Acts

- No. 1/1976 – Local Government Provisional Order Confirmation Act 1976

=== 1977 ===
- No. 1/1977 – Local Government (Water Pollution) Act 1977
- No. 2/1977 – Health Contributions (Amendment) Act 1977
- No. 3/1977 – Social Welfare Act 1977
- No. 4/1977 – Bula Limited (Acquisition of Shares) Act 1977
- No. 5/1977 – European Communities (Amendment) Act 1977
- No. 6/1977 – Worker Participation (State Enterprises) Act 1977
- No. 7/1977 – Protection of Employment Act 1977
- No. 8/1977 – Intoxicating Liquor Act 1977
- No. 9/1977 – Protection of Young Persons (Employment) Act 1977
- No. 10/1977 – Unfair Dismissals Act 1977
- No. 11/1977 – Courts Act 1977
- No. 12/1977 – Misuse of Drugs Act 1977
- No. 13/1977 – National Agricultural Advisory, Education and Research Authority Act 1977
- No. 14/1977 – Prisons Act 1977
- No. 15/1977 – Oil Pollution of the Sea (Amendment) Act 1977
- No. 16/1977 – Employment Equality Act 1977
- No. 17/1977 – Friendly Societies (Amendment) Act 1977
- No. 18/1977 – Finance Act 1977
- No. 19/1977 – Bretton Woods Agreements (Amendment) Act 1977
- No. 20/1977 – Industrial Credit (Amendment) Act 1977
- No. 21/1977 – Export Promotion (Amendment) Act 1977
- No. 22/1977 – Telephone Capital Act 1977
- No. 23/1977 – Dairy Produce (Miscellaneous Provisions) (Amendment) Act 1977
- No. 24/1977 – Garda Síochána Act 1977
- No. 25/1977 – National Board For Science and Technology Act 1977
- No. 26/1977 – Control of Exports (Temporary Provisions) Act 1956 (Continuance) Act 1977
- No. 27/1977 – Ministers and Secretaries (Amendment) Act 1977
- No. 28/1977 – Ministers and Secretaries (Amendment) (No. 2) Act 1977
- No. 29/1977 – Oireachtas (Allowances To Members) and Ministerial, Parliamentary and Judicial Offices (Amendment) Act 1977
- No. 30/1977 – European Assembly Elections Act 1977
- No. 31/1977 – Companies (Amendment) Act 1977
- No. 32/1977 – Finance (Excise Duty on Tobacco Products) Act 1977
- No. 33/1977 – Gaeltacht Industries (Amendment) Act 1977
- No. 34/1977 – International Development Association (Amendment) Act 1977
- No. 35/1977 – Nítrigin Éireann Teoranta Act 1977
- No. 36/1977 – Appropriation Act 1977
- No. 37/1977 – Industrial Development Act 1977

=== 1978 ===
- No. 1/1978 – Consumer Information Act 1978
- No. 2/1978 – Agricultural Credit Act 1978
- No. 3/1978 – Shannon Free Airport Development Company Limited (Amendment) Act 1978
- No. 4/1978 – Medical Practitioners Act 1978
- No. 5/1978 – Social Welfare Act 1978
- No. 6/1978 – Health Contributions (Amendment) Act 1978
- No. 7/1978 – Landlord and Tenant (Ground Rents) Act 1978
- No. 8/1978 – Road Transport Act 1978
- No. 9/1978 – Rates on Agricultural Land (Relief) Act 1978
- No. 10/1978 – Local Loans Fund (Amendment) Act 1978
- No. 11/1978 – Restrictive Practices (Confirmation of Order) Act 1978
- No. 12/1978 – Restrictive Practices (Confirmation of Order) (No. 2) Act 1978
- No. 13/1978 – Agricultural Produce (Meat) (Miscellaneous Provisions) Act 1978
- No. 14/1978 – Bord na Gaeilge Act 1978
- No. 15/1978 – Commissioners of Public Works in Ireland (Acceptance of Trusteeship) Act 1978
- No. 16/1978 – Landlord and Tenant (Ground Rents) (No. 2) Act 1978
- No. 17/1978 – Mergers, Take-Overs and Monopolies (Control) Act 1978
- No. 18/1978 – Fisheries (Amendment) Act 1978
- No. 19/1978 – Road Traffic (Amendment) Act 1978
- No. 20/1978 – International Development Association (Special Action Account) Act 1978
- No. 21/1978 – Finance Act 1978
- No. 22/1978 – Land Bond Act 1978
- No. 23/1978 – Industrial and Provident Societies (Amendment) Act 1978
- No. 24/1978 – Exchange Control (Continuance and Amendment) Act 1978
- No. 25/1978 – Social Welfare (Amendment) Act 1978
- No. 26/1978 – Local Authorities (Higher Education Grants) Act 1978
- No. 27/1978 – Tobacco Products (Control of Advertising, Sponsorship and Sales Promotion) Act 1978
- No. 28/1978 – Air Companies (Amendment) Act 1978
- No. 29/1978 – Industrial Development Act 1978
- No. 30/1978 – Insurance (Amendment) Act 1978
- No. 31/1978 – Restrictive Practices (Confirmation of Order) (No. 3) Act 1978
- No. 32/1978 – Appropriation Act 1978
- No. 33/1978 – Capital Gains Tax (Amendment) Act 1978
- No. 34/1978 – Value-Added Tax (Amendment) Act 1978
- No. 35/1978 – Local Government (Financial Provisions) Act 1978

=== 1979 ===
- No. 1/1979 – Defence (Amendment) Act 1979
- No. 2/1979 – Electricity (Supply) (Amendment) Act 1979
- No. 3/1979 – Tribunals of Inquiry (Evidence) (Amendment) Act 1979
- No. 4/1979 – Health Contributions Act 1979
- No. 5/1979 – Údarás na Gaeltachta Act 1979
- No. 6/1979 – Gaming and Lotteries Act 1979
- No. 7/1979 – Redundancy Payments Act 1979
- No. 8/1979 – Social Welfare Act 1979
- No. 9/1979 – Agriculture (An Chomhairle Oiliuna Talmhaiochta) Act 1979
- No. 10/1979 – Referendum (Amendment) Act 1979
- No. 11/1979 – Finance Act 1979
- No. 12/1979 – Minerals Development Act 1979
- No. 13/1979 – Irish Steel Holdings Limited (Amendment) Act 1979
- No. 14/1979 – Restrictive Practices (Confirmation of Order) Act 1979
- No. 15/1979 – Courts Act 1979
- No. 16/1979 – Garda Síochána Act 1979
- No. 17/1979 – Trustee Savings Banks Act 1979
- No. 18/1979 – Transport (Miscellaneous Provisions) Act 1979
- No. 19/1979 – European Assembly (Irish Representatives) Act 1979
- No. 20/1979 – Health (Family Planning) Act 1979
- No. 21/1979 – Dangerous Substances (Amendment) Act 1979
- No. 22/1979 – Tourist Traffic Act 1979
- No. 23/1979 – British & Irish Steam Packet Company Limited (Acquisition) (Amendment) Act 1979
- No. 24/1979 – Milk (Miscellaneous Provisions) Act 1979
- No. 25/1979 – Córas Beostoic agus Feola Act 1979
- No. 26/1979 – Bovine Diseases (Levies) Act 1979
- No. 27/1979 – Housing (Miscellaneous Provisions) Act 1979
- No. 28/1979 – Defence (Amendment) (No. 2) Act 1979
- No. 29/1979 – Housing (Gaeltacht) (Amendment) Act 1979
- No. 30/1979 – National Council For Educational Awards Act 1979
- No. 31/1979 – Agricultural Credit Act 1979
- No. 32/1979 – European Communities (Amendment) Act 1979
- No. 33/1979 – Industrial Research and Standards (Amendment) Act 1979
- No. 34/1979 – Local Government (Toll Roads) Act 1979
- No. 35/1979 – Occasional Trading Act 1979
- No. 36/1979 – Broadcasting Authority (Amendment) Act 1979
- No. 37/1979 – Merchant Shipping (Certification of Seamen) Act 1979
- No. 38/1979 – Dairy Produce (Miscellaneous Provisions) (Amendment) Act 1979
- No. 39/1979 – Industrial Credit (Amendment) Act 1979
- No. 40/1979 – Payment of Wages Act 1979
- No. 41/1979 – Appropriation Act 1979

Private Acts

- No. 1/1979 – The Royal College of Physicians of Ireland (Charter and Letters Patent Amendment) Act 1979
- No. 2/1979 – Local Government Provisional Order Confirmation Act 1979

Constitutional Amendments

- Sixth Amendment of the Constitution (Adoption) Act 1979
- Seventh Amendment of the Constitution (Election of Members of Seanad Éireann by Institutions of Higher Education) Act 1979

== 1980–1989 ==
=== 1980 ===
- No. 1/1980 – Fisheries Act 1980
- No. 2/1980 – Ministers and Secretaries (Amendment) Act 1980
- No. 3/1980 – Social Welfare Act 1980
- No. 4/1980 – Employment Guarantee Fund Act 1980
- No. 5/1980 – Land Bond Act 1980
- No. 6/1980 – Prisons Act 1980
- No. 7/1980 – Arbitration Act 1980
- No. 8/1980 – Local Government (Superannuation) Act 1980
- No. 9/1980 – Safety in Industry Act 1980
- No. 10/1980 – Landlord and Tenant (Amendment) Act 1980
- No. 11/1980 – Packaged Goods (Quantity Control) Act 1980
- No. 12/1980 – Agriculture (Amendment) Act 1980
- No. 13/1980 – Turf Development Act 1980
- No. 14/1980 – Finance Act 1980
- No. 15/1980 – International Development Association (Amendment) Act 1980
- No. 16/1980 – Sale of Goods and Supply of Services Act 1980
- No. 17/1980 – Electoral (Amendment) Act 1980
- No. 18/1980 – Export Promotion (Amendment) Act 1980
- No. 19/1980 – Restrictive Practices (Confirmation of Order) Act 1980
- No. 20/1980 – Rates on Agricultural Land (Relief) Act 1980
- No. 21/1980 – Army Pensions Act 1980
- No. 22/1980 – Fishery Harbour Centres Act 1980
- No. 23/1980 – Trading Stamps Act 1980
- No. 24/1980 – Plant Varieties (Proprietary Rights) Act 1980
- No. 25/1980 – National Institute For Higher Education, Limerick, Act 1980
- No. 26/1980 – Ombudsman Act 1980
- No. 27/1980 – Pyramid Selling Act 1980
- No. 28/1980 – Shannon Free Airport Development Company Limited (Amendment) Act 1980
- No. 29/1980 – Social Welfare (Temporary Provisions) Act 1980
- No. 30/1980 – National Institute For Higher Education, Dublin, Act 1980
- No. 31/1980 – Building Societies (Amendment) Act 1980
- No. 32/1980 – Johnstown Castle Agricultural College (Amendment) Act 1980
- No. 33/1980 – Irish Whiskey Act 1980
- No. 34/1980 – Thomond College of Education, Limerick, Act 1980
- No. 35/1980 – Gas (Amendment) Act 1980
- No. 36/1980 – Irish Film Board Act 1980
- No. 37/1980 – National Film Studios of Ireland Limited Act 1980
- No. 38/1980 – Restrictive Practices (Confirmation of Order) (No. 2) Act 1980
- No. 39/1980 – Irish Shipping Limited (Amendment) Act 1980
- No. 40/1980 – Electoral (Amendment) (No. 2) Act 1980
- No. 41/1980 – Local Loans Fund (Amendment) Act 1980
- No. 42/1980 – Industrial Alcohol (Amendment) Act 1980
- No. 43/1980 – Casual Trading Act 1980
- No. 44/1980 – Appropriation Act 1980

=== 1981 ===
- No. 1/1981 – Social Welfare (Consolidation) Act 1981
- No. 2/1981 – Maternity Protection of Employees Act 1981
- No. 3/1981 – Social Welfare (Amendment) Act 1981
- No. 4/1981 – Restrictive Practices (Confirmation of Order) Act 1981
- No. 5/1981 – Intoxicating Liquor Act 1981
- No. 6/1981 – Night Work (Bakeries) (Amendment) Act 1981
- No. 7/1981 – Restrictive Practices (Confirmation of Order) (No. 2) Act 1981
- No. 8/1981 – Dumping At Sea Act 1981
- No. 9/1981 – Malicious Injuries Act 1981
- No. 10/1981 – Criminal Law (Rape) Act 1981
- No. 11/1981 – Courts Act 1981
- No. 12/1981 – Nítrigin Éireann Teoranta Act 1981
- No. 13/1981 – Industrial Development Act 1981
- No. 14/1981 – Industrial Development (No. 2) Act 1981
- No. 15/1981 – Telecommunications Capital Act 1981
- No. 16/1981 – Finance Act 1981
- No. 17/1981 – Health (Mental Services) Act 1981
- No. 18/1981 – Hallmarking Act 1981
- No. 19/1981 – Employers' Employment Contribution Scheme Act 1981
- No. 20/1981 – Turf Development Act 1981
- No. 21/1981 – Family Law (Protection of Spouses and Children) Act 1981
- No. 22/1981 – Family Law Act 1981
- No. 23/1981 – Transport Act 1981
- No. 24/1981 – Electricity (Supply) (Amendment) Act 1981
- No. 25/1981 – Employment Guarantee Fund (Amendment) Act 1981
- No. 26/1981 – Rent Restrictions (Temporary Provisions) Act 1981
- No. 27/1981 – Irish Telecommunications Investments Limited Act 1981
- No. 28/1981 – Finance (No. 2) Act 1981
- No. 29/1981 – Social Welfare (Temporary Provisions) Act 1981
- No. 30/1981 – Fire Services Act 1981
- No. 31/1981 – Courts (No. 2) Act 1981
- No. 32/1981 – Youth Employment Agency Act 1981
- No. 33/1981 – Merchant Shipping Act 1981
- No. 34/1981 – Insurance Act 1981
- No. 35/1981 – Rent Restrictions (Temporary Provisions) (Continuance) Act 1981
- No. 36/1981 – Appropriation Act 1981
- No. 37/1981 – Housing Finance Agency Act 1981

=== 1982 ===
- No. 1/1982 – Fóir Teoranta (Amendment) Act 1982
- No. 2/1982 – Social Welfare Act 1982
- No. 3/1982 – Transport (Tour Operators and Travel Agents) Act 1982
- No. 4/1982 – Rent Restrictions (Temporary Provisions) (Continuance) Act 1982
- No. 5/1982 – Prevention of Electoral Abuses Act 1982
- No. 6/1982 – Housing (Private Rented Dwellings) Act 1982
- No. 7/1982 – International Common Fund For Commodities Act 1982
- No. 8/1982 – Irish Shipping Limited Act 1982
- No. 9/1982 – British & Irish Steam Packet Company Limited (Acquisition) (Amendment) Act 1982
- No. 10/1982 – Companies (Amendment) Act 1982
- No. 11/1982 – Litter Act 1982
- No. 12/1982 – Sea Fisheries (Amendment) Act 1982
- No. 13/1982 – Irish Steel Holdings Limited (Amendment) Act 1982
- No. 14/1982 – Finance Act 1982
- No. 15/1982 – Trade Disputes (Amendment) Act 1982
- No. 16/1982 – Gas Regulation Act 1982
- No. 17/1982 – Gas (Amendment) Act 1982
- No. 18/1982 – Fuels (Control of Supplies) Act 1982
- No. 19/1982 – Sugar Manufacture (Amendment) Act 1982
- No. 20/1982 – National Community Development Agency Act 1982
- No. 21/1982 – Local Government (Planning and Development) Act 1982
- No. 22/1982 – Electricity (Supply) (Amendment) Act 1982
- No. 23/1982 – Social Welfare (No. 2) Act 1982
- No. 24/1982 – Agricultural Credit Act 1982
- No. 25/1982 – Exchange Control (Continuance) Act 1982
- No. 26/1982 – Kilkenny Design Workshops Limited Act 1982
- No. 27/1982 – Housing Finance Agency (Amendment) Act 1982
- No. 28/1982 – Control of Exports (Temporary Provisions) Act 1956 (Continuance) Act 1982
- No. 29/1982 – Appropriation Act 1982

=== 1983 ===
- No. 1/1983 – Local Authorities (Officers and Employees) Act 1983
- No. 2/1983 – Foyle Fisheries (Amendment) Act 1983
- No. 3/1983 – Air Companies (Amendment) Act 1983
- No. 4/1983 – Export Promotion (Amendment) Act 1983
- No. 5/1983 – Insurance Act 1983
- No. 6/1983 – Social Welfare Act 1983
- No. 7/1983 – Industrial Credit (Amendment) Act 1983
- No. 8/1983 – Irish Telecommunications Investments Limited (Amendment) Act 1983
- No. 9/1983 – Land Bond Act 1983
- No. 10/1983 – Local Government (Financial Provisions) Act 1983
- No. 11/1983 – Statute Law Revision Act 1983
- No. 12/1983 – Shannon Free Airport Development Company Limited (Amendment) Act 1983
- No. 13/1983 – Companies (Amendment) Act 1983
- No. 14/1983 – Referendum (Amendment) Act 1983
- No. 15/1983 – Finance Act 1983
- No. 16/1983 – Local Loans Fund (Amendment) Act 1983
- No. 17/1983 – Irish Steel Limited (Amendment) Act 1983
- No. 18/1983 – Merchant Shipping (Light Dues) Act 1983
- No. 19/1983 – Courts-Martial Appeals Act 1983
- No. 20/1983 – Landlord and Tenant (Ground Rents) (Amendment) Act 1983
- No. 21/1983 – Local Government (Financial Provisions) (No. 2) Act 1983
- No. 22/1983 – Housing (Private Rented Dwellings) (Amendment) Act 1983
- No. 23/1983 – Criminal Justice (Community Service) Act 1983
- No. 24/1983 – Postal and Telecommunications Services Act 1983
- No. 25/1983 – Building Societies (Amendment) Act 1983
- No. 26/1983 – Turf Development Act 1983
- No. 27/1983 – Fisheries (Amendment) Act 1983
- No. 28/1983 – Local Government (Planning and Development) Act 1983
- No. 29/1983 – Insurance (No. 2) Act 1983
- No. 30/1983 – Dentists (Amendment) Act 1983
- No. 31/1983 – Tourist Traffic Act 1983
- No. 32/1983 – Oireachtas (Allowances To Members) and Ministerial, Parliamentary and Judicial Offices (Amendment) Act 1983
- No. 33/1983 – International Development Association (Amendment) Act 1983
- No. 34/1983 – Intoxicating Liquor (National Concert Hall) Act 1983
- No. 35/1983 – Control of Exports Act 1983
- No. 36/1983 – Electoral (Amendment) Act 1983
- No. 37/1983 – Transport Act 1983
- No. 38/1983 – Air Navigation (Eurocontrol) Act 1983
- No. 39/1983 – Export Promotion (Amendment) (No. 2) Act 1983
- No. 40/1983 – Ministers and Secretaries (Amendment) Act 1983
- No. 41/1983 – Appropriation Act 1983
- No. 42/1983 – Fóir Teoranta (Amendment) Act 1983

Constitutional Amendments

- Eighth Amendment of the Constitution Act 1983

=== 1984 ===
- No. 1/1984 – Housing Act 1984
- No. 2/1984 – National Social Service Board Act 1984
- No. 3/1984 – Dairy Produce (Miscellaneous Provisions) (Amendment) Act 1984
- No. 4/1984 – Landlord and Tenant (Amendment) Act 1984
- No. 5/1984 – Social Welfare Act 1984
- No. 6/1984 – European Assembly Elections Act 1984
- No. 7/1984 – Referendum (Amendment) Act 1984
- No. 8/1984 – Irish Shipping Limited (Amendment) Act 1984
- No. 9/1984 – Finance Act 1984
- No. 10/1984 – Postal and Telecommunications Services (Amendment) Act 1984
- No. 11/1984 – Wool Marketing Act 1984
- No. 12/1984 – Exported Live Stock (Insurance) Act 1984
- No. 13/1984 – Protection of Animals Kept For Farming Purposes Act 1984
- No. 14/1984 – Irish Steel Limited (Amendment) Act 1984
- No. 15/1984 – Landlord and Tenant (Ground Rents) (Amendment) Act 1984
- No. 16/1984 – Road Traffic (Amendment) Act 1984
- No. 17/1984 – Funds of Suitors Act 1984
- No. 18/1984 – Misuse of Drugs Act 1984
- No. 19/1984 – Ombudsman (Amendment) Act 1984
- No. 20/1984 – European Communities (Supplementary Funding) Act 1984
- No. 21/1984 – Protection of Employees (Employers' Insolvency) Act 1984
- No. 22/1984 – Criminal Justice Act 1984
- No. 23/1984 – State Financial Transactions (Special Provisions) Act 1984
- No. 24/1984 – Land Act 1984
- No. 25/1984 – Registration of Potato Growers and Potato Packers Act 1984
- No. 26/1984 – Appropriation Act 1984
- No. 27/1984 – Social Welfare (Amendment) Act 1984

Constitutional Amendments

- Ninth Amendment of the Constitution Act 1984

=== 1985 ===
- No. 1/1985 – European Communities (Amendment) Act 1985
- No. 2/1985 – Age of Majority Act 1985
- No. 3/1985 – Offences Against the State (Amendment) Act 1985
- No. 4/1985 – Health (Family Planning) (Amendment) Act 1985
- No. 5/1985 – Social Welfare Act 1985
- No. 6/1985 – Electricity (Supply) (Amendment) Act 1985
- No. 7/1985 – Local Government (Reorganisation) Act 1985
- No. 8/1985 – Insurance (Miscellaneous Provisions) Act 1985
- No. 9/1985 – Dentists Act 1985
- No. 10/1985 – Finance Act 1985
- No. 11/1985 – Animals Act 1985
- No. 12/1985 – Electoral (Amendment) Act 1985
- No. 13/1985 – Control of Bulls For Breeding Act 1985
- No. 14/1985 – Social Welfare (No. 2) Act 1985
- No. 15/1985 – Transport Act 1985
- No. 16/1985 – Designated Investment Funds Act 1985
- No. 17/1985 – Farm Tax Act 1985
- No. 18/1985 – Nurses Act 1985
- No. 19/1985 – European Communities (Amendment) (No. 2) Act 1985
- No. 20/1985 – Housing Finance Agency (Amendment) Act 1985
- No. 21/1985 – International Development Association (Amendment) Act 1985
- No. 22/1985 – Irish Steel Limited (Amendment) Act 1985
- No. 23/1985 – Courts Act 1985
- No. 24/1985 – Appropriation Act 1985

=== 1986 ===
- No. 1/1986 – Courts Act 1986
- No. 2/1986 – Valuation Act 1986
- No. 3/1986 – Canals Act 1986
- No. 4/1986 – Air Transport Act 1986
- No. 5/1986 – National Development Corporation Act 1986
- No. 6/1986 – Free Ports Act 1986
- No. 7/1986 – Slaughtered and Detained Animals (Compensation) Act 1986
- No. 8/1986 – Social Welfare Act 1986
- No. 9/1986 – Industrial Development Act 1986
- No. 10/1986 – Health (Amendment) Act 1986
- No. 11/1986 – National Archives Act 1986
- No. 12/1986 – Electoral (Amendment) Act 1986
- No. 13/1986 – Finance Act 1986
- No. 14/1986 – Combat Poverty Agency Act 1986
- No. 15/1986 – Dublin Transport Authority Act 1986
- No. 16/1986 – Road Transport Act 1986
- No. 17/1986 – Chester Beatty Library Act 1986
- No. 18/1986 – Air Navigation and Transport (Preinspection) Act 1986
- No. 19/1986 – Urban Renewal Act 1986
- No. 20/1986 – Shannon Free Airport Development Company Limited (Amendment) Act 1986
- No. 21/1986 – Local Loans Fund (Amendment) Act 1986
- No. 22/1986 – British & Irish Steam Packet Company Limited (Acquisition) (Amendment) Act 1986
- No. 23/1986 – Irish Nationality and Citizenship Act 1986
- No. 24/1986 – Domicile and Recognition of Foreign Divorces Act 1986
- No. 25/1986 – Companies (Amendment) Act 1986
- No. 26/1986 – Courts (No. 2) Act 1986
- No. 27/1986 – Malicious Injuries (Amendment) Act 1986
- No. 28/1986 – National Lottery Act 1986
- No. 29/1986 – Garda Síochána (Complaints) Act 1986
- No. 30/1986 – Dublin Metropolitan Streets Commission Act 1986
- No. 31/1986 – Transport (Re-Organisation of Córas Iompair Éireann) Act 1986
- No. 32/1986 – Control of Dogs Act 1986
- No. 33/1986 – Courts (No. 3) Act 1986
- No. 34/1986 – Income Tax (Amendment) Act 1986
- No. 35/1986 – Electoral (Amendment) (No. 2) Act 1986
- No. 36/1986 – Building Societies (Amendment) Act 1986
- No. 37/1986 – European Communities (Amendment) Act 1986
- No. 38/1986 – Exchange Control (Continuance) Act 1986
- No. 39/1986 – Appropriation Act 1986

=== 1987 ===
- No. 1/1987 – Extradition (European Convention on the Suppression of Terrorism) Act 1987
- No. 2/1987 – Social Welfare Act 1987
- No. 3/1987 – Health (Amendment) Act 1987
- No. 4/1987 – Referendum (Amendment) Act 1987
- No. 5/1987 – Údarás na Gaeltachta (Amendment) Act 1987
- No. 6/1987 – Air Pollution Act 1987
- No. 7/1987 – Agriculture (An Chomhairle Oiliúna Talmhaíochta) Act 1987
- No. 8/1987 – Defence (Amendment) Act 1987
- No. 9/1987 – Gas (Amendment) Act 1987
- No. 10/1987 – Finance Act 1987
- No. 11/1987 – Tourist Traffic Act 1987
- No. 12/1987 – Landlord and Tenant (Ground Rents) (Amendment) Act 1987
- No. 13/1987 – Export Promotion (Amendment) Act 1987
- No. 14/1987 – Fisheries (Amendment) Act 1987
- No. 15/1987 – Labour Services Act 1987
- No. 16/1987 – Urban Renewal (Amendment) Act 1987
- No. 17/1987 – National Monuments (Amendment) Act 1987
- No. 18/1987 – Safety, Health and Welfare (Offshore Installations) Act 1987
- No. 19/1987 – Local Loans Fund (Amendment) Act 1987
- No. 20/1987 – International Carriage of Perishable Foodstuffs Act 1987
- No. 21/1987 – Shipping Investment Grants Act 1987
- No. 22/1987 – Nítrigin Éireann Teoranta Act 1987
- No. 23/1987 – Restrictive Practices (Confirmation of Order) Act 1987
- No. 24/1987 – Copyright (Amendment) Act 1987
- No. 25/1987 – Extradition (Amendment) Act 1987
- No. 26/1987 – Status of Children Act 1987
- No. 27/1987 – Transport Act 1987
- No. 28/1987 – Control of Clinical Trials Act 1987
- No. 29/1987 – Social Welfare (No. 2) Act 1987
- No. 30/1987 – Science and Technology Act 1987
- No. 31/1987 – Restrictive Practices (Amendment) Act 1987
- No. 32/1987 – Fisheries (Amendment) (No. 2) Act 1987
- No. 33/1987 – Appropriation Act 1987
- No. 34/1987 – Dublin Transport Authority (Dissolution) Act 1987

Constitutional Amendments

- Tenth Amendment of the Constitution Act 1987

=== 1988 ===
- No. 1/1988 – Housing Finance Agency (Amendment) Act 1988
- No. 2/1988 – Valuation Act 1988
- No. 3/1988 – Jurisdiction of Courts and Enforcement of Judgments (European Communities) Act 1988
- No. 4/1988 – B & I Line Act 1988
- No. 5/1988 – International Development Association (Amendment) Act 1988
- No. 6/1988 – Agricultural Credit Act 1988
- No. 7/1988 – Social Welfare Act 1988
- No. 8/1988 – Abattoirs Act 1988
- No. 9/1988 – Maritime Jurisdiction (Amendment) Act 1988
- No. 10/1988 – Customs and Excise (Miscellaneous Provisions) Act 1988
- No. 11/1988 – Oil Pollution of the Sea (Civil Liability and Compensation) Act 1988
- No. 12/1988 – Finance Act 1988
- No. 13/1988 – Worker Participation (State Enterprises) Act 1988
- No. 14/1988 – Courts Act 1988
- No. 15/1988 – Air Navigation and Transport Act 1988
- No. 16/1988 – Intoxicating Liquor Act 1988
- No. 17/1988 – Electricity (Supply) (Amendment) Act 1988
- No. 18/1988 – Agriculture (Research, Training and Advice) Act 1988
- No. 19/1988 – Broadcasting and Wireless Telegraphy Act 1988
- No. 20/1988 – Radio and Television Act 1988
- No. 21/1988 – European Communities (Funding) Act 1988
- No. 22/1988 – Insurance (Export Guarantees) Act 1988
- No. 23/1988 – Córas Beostoic agus Feola (Amendment) Act 1988
- No. 24/1988 – Tobacco (Health Promotion and Protection) Act 1988
- No. 25/1988 – Data Protection Act 1988
- No. 26/1988 – Forestry Act 1988
- No. 27/1988 – Bankruptcy Act 1988
- No. 28/1988 – Housing Act 1988
- No. 29/1988 – Local Government (Multi-Storey Buildings) Act 1988
- No. 30/1988 – Adoption Act 1988
- No. 31/1988 – Family Law Act 1988
- No. 32/1988 – Multilateral Investment Guarantee Agency Act 1988
- No. 33/1988 – Irish Sailors and Soldiers Land Trust Act 1988
- No. 34/1988 – Courts (No. 2) Act 1988
- No. 35/1988 – Appropriation Act 1988

=== 1989 ===
- No. 1/1989 – Garda Síochána Act 1989
- No. 2/1989 – Landlord and Tenant (Amendment) Act 1989
- No. 3/1989 – Insurance Act 1989
- No. 4/1989 – Social Welfare Act 1989
- No. 5/1989 – Jurisdiction of Courts (Maritime Conventions) Act 1989
- No. 6/1989 – Judicial Separation and Family Law Reform Act 1989
- No. 7/1989 – Safety, Health and Welfare At Work Act 1989
- No. 8/1989 – Electoral (Amendment) Act 1989
- No. 9/1989 – Bord na gCapall (Dissolution) Act 1989
- No. 10/1989 – Finance Act 1989
- No. 11/1989 – An Blascaod Mór National Historic Park Act 1989
- No. 12/1989 – Social Welfare (No. 2) Act 1989
- No. 13/1989 – Shannon Free Airport Development Company Limited (Amendment) Act 1989
- No. 14/1989 – University of Limerick Act 1989
- No. 15/1989 – Dublin City University Act 1989
- No. 16/1989 – Central Bank Act 1989
- No. 17/1989 – Building Societies Act 1989
- No. 18/1989 – Children Act 1989
- No. 19/1989 – Prohibition of Incitement To Hatred Act 1989
- No. 20/1989 – Údarás na Gaeltachta (Amendment) Act 1989
- No. 21/1989 – Trustee Savings Banks Act 1989
- No. 22/1989 – Video Recordings Act 1989
- No. 23/1989 – Appropriation Act 1989

Private Acts

- No. 1/1989 – Local Government Provisional Order Confirmation Act 1989

== 1990–1999 ==
=== 1990 ===
- No. 1/1990 – Bord Glas Act 1990
- No. 2/1990 – Decimal Currency Act 1990
- No. 3/1990 – Building Control Act 1990
- No. 4/1990 – B & I Line Act 1990
- No. 5/1990 – Social Welfare Act 1990
- No. 6/1990 – Defence (Amendment) Act 1990
- No. 7/1990 – Dún Laoghaire Harbour Act 1990
- No. 8/1990 – Horse Breeding Act 1990
- No. 9/1990 – Larceny Act 1990
- No. 10/1990 – Finance Act 1990
- No. 11/1990 – Local Government (Planning and Development) Act 1990
- No. 12/1990 – Firearms and Offensive Weapons Act 1990
- No. 13/1990 – International Carriage of Goods by Road Act 1990
- No. 14/1990 – Derelict Sites Act 1990
- No. 15/1990 – Industrial Credit (Amendment) Act 1990
- No. 16/1990 – Criminal Justice Act 1990
- No. 17/1990 – Control of Clinical Trials and Drugs Act 1990
- No. 18/1990 – National Treasury Management Agency Act 1990
- No. 19/1990 – Industrial Relations Act 1990
- No. 20/1990 – Shannon Navigation Act 1990
- No. 21/1990 – Local Government (Water Pollution) (Amendment) Act 1990
- No. 22/1990 – Turf Development Act 1990
- No. 23/1990 – Health (Nursing Homes) Act 1990
- No. 24/1990 – Broadcasting Act 1990
- No. 25/1990 – Pensions Act 1990
- No. 26/1990 – Insurance Act 1990
- No. 27/1990 – Companies (Amendment) Act 1990
- No. 28/1990 – Teachers' Superannuation (Amendment) Act 1990
- No. 29/1990 – International Development Association (Amendment) Act 1990
- No. 30/1990 – Public Hospitals (Amendment) Act 1990
- No. 31/1990 – Fóir Teoranta (Dissolution) Act 1990
- No. 32/1990 – Criminal Law (Rape) (Amendment) Act 1990
- No. 33/1990 – Companies Act 1990
- No. 34/1990 – Criminal Justice (Forensic Evidence) Act 1990
- No. 35/1990 – Exchange Control (Continuance) Act 1990
- No. 36/1990 – Electoral (Amendment) Act 1990
- No. 37/1990 – Unit Trusts Act 1990
- No. 38/1990 – Appropriation Act 1990

=== 1991 ===
- No. 1/1991 – European Bank For Reconstruction and Development Act 1991
- No. 2/1991 – Marine Institute Act 1991
- No. 3/1991 – Sugar Act 1991
- No. 4/1991 – Destructive Insects and Pests (Amendment) Act 1991
- No. 5/1991 – Worker Protection (Regular Part-Time Employees) Act 1991
- No. 6/1991 – Child Abduction and Enforcement of Custody Orders Act 1991
- No. 7/1991 – Social Welfare Act 1991
- No. 8/1991 – Contractual Obligations (Applicable Law) Act 1991
- No. 9/1991 – Radiological Protection Act 1991
- No. 10/1991 – Presidential Establishment (Amendment) Act 1991
- No. 11/1991 – Local Government Act 1991
- No. 12/1991 – Educational Exchange (Ireland and the United States of America) Act 1991
- No. 13/1991 – Finance Act 1991
- No. 14/1991 – Adoption Act 1991
- No. 15/1991 – Health (Amendment) Act 1991
- No. 16/1991 – University of Limerick (Dissolution of Thomond College) Act 1991
- No. 17/1991 – Child Care Act 1991
- No. 18/1991 – Statute of Limitations (Amendment) Act 1991
- No. 19/1991 – Temple Bar Area Renewal and Development Act 1991
- No. 20/1991 – Courts Act 1991
- No. 21/1991 – Courts (No. 2) Act 1991
- No. 22/1991 – Trade and Marketing Promotion Act 1991
- No. 23/1991 – Courts (Supplemental Provisions) (Amendment) Act 1991
- No. 24/1991 – Competition Act 1991
- No. 25/1991 – Payment of Wages Act 1991
- No. 26/1991 – Fisheries (Amendment) Act 1991
- No. 27/1991 – Sea Pollution Act 1991
- No. 28/1991 – Liability for Defective Products Act 1991
- No. 29/1991 – B & I Line Act 1991
- No. 30/1991 – Industrial Development (Amendment) Act 1991
- No. 31/1991 – Criminal Damage Act 1991
- No. 32/1991 – Appropriation Act 1991

=== 1992 ===
- No. 1/1992 – Patents Act 1992
- No. 2/1992 – Merchant Shipping Act 1992
- No. 3/1992 – Oireachtas (Allowances To Members) and Ministerial and Parliamentary Offices (Amendment) Act 1992
- No. 4/1992 – Land Bond Act 1992
- No. 5/1992 – Social Welfare Act 1992
- No. 6/1992 – Acc Bank Act 1992
- No. 7/1992 – Environmental Protection Agency Act 1992
- No. 8/1992 – Referendum (Amendment) Act 1992
- No. 9/1992 – Finance Act 1992
- No. 10/1992 – Fishery Harbour Centres (Amendment) Act 1992
- No. 11/1992 – Financial Transactions of Certain Companies and Other Bodies Act 1992
- No. 12/1992 – Criminal Evidence Act 1992
- No. 13/1992 – Control of Dogs (Amendment) Act 1992
- No. 14/1992 – Local Government (Planning and Development) Act 1992
- No. 15/1992 – Dublin Institute of Technology Act 1992
- No. 16/1992 – Regional Technical Colleges Act 1992
- No. 17/1992 – Foreshore (Amendment) Act 1992
- No. 18/1992 – Housing (Miscellaneous Provisions) Act 1992
- No. 19/1992 – Local Authorities (Higher Education Grants) Act 1992
- No. 20/1992 – Health (Family Planning) (Amendment) Act 1992
- No. 21/1992 – ICC Bank Act 1992
- No. 22/1992 – Referendum (Amendment) (No. 2) Act 1992
- No. 23/1992 – Electoral Act 1992
- No. 24/1992 – European Communities (Amendment) Act 1992
- No. 25/1992 – Irish Land Commission (Dissolution) Act 1992
- No. 26/1992 – Appropriation Act 1992
- No. 27/1992 – Financial Transfers Act 1992
- No. 28/1992 – Finance (No. 2) Act 1992
- No. 29/1992 – Censorship of Films (Amendment) Act 1992

Private Acts

- No. 1/1992 – Limerick Markets Act 1992

Constitutional Amendments

- Eleventh Amendment of the Constitution Act 1992
- Thirteenth Amendment of the Constitution Act 1992
- Fourteenth Amendment of the Constitution Act 1992

=== 1993 ===
- No. 1/1993 – State Authorities (Development and Management) Act 1993
- No. 2/1993 – Údarás na Gaeltachta (Amendment) Act 1993
- No. 3/1993 – Nítrigin Éireann Teoranta Act 1993
- No. 4/1993 – National Stud (Amendment) Act 1993
- No. 5/1993 – Social Welfare Act 1993
- No. 6/1993 – Criminal Justice Act 1993
- No. 7/1993 – Gas (Amendment) Act 1993
- No. 8/1993 – Comptroller and Auditor General (Amendment) Act 1993
- No. 9/1993 – Jurisdiction of Courts and Enforcement of Judgments Act 1993
- No. 10/1993 – Interception of Postal Packets and Telecommunications Messages (Regulation) Act 1993
- No. 11/1993 – Criminal Law (Suicide) Act 1993
- No. 12/1993 – Local Government (Planning and Development) Act 1993
- No. 13/1993 – Finance Act 1993
- No. 14/1993 – Roads Act 1993
- No. 15/1993 – Broadcasting Authority (Amendment) Act 1993
- No. 16/1993 – Health (Family Planning) (Amendment) Act 1993
- No. 17/1993 – Medical Practitioners (Amendment) Act 1993
- No. 18/1993 – Defence (Amendment) Act 1993
- No. 19/1993 – Industrial Development Act 1993
- No. 20/1993 – Criminal Law (Sexual Offences) Act 1993
- No. 21/1993 – Statistics Act 1993
- No. 22/1993 – Unfair Dismissals (Amendment) Act 1993
- No. 23/1993 – Animal Remedies Act 1993
- No. 24/1993 – Waiver of Certain Tax, Interest and Penalties Act 1993
- No. 25/1993 – European Communities (Amendment) Act 1993
- No. 26/1993 – International Development Association (Amendment) Act 1993
- No. 27/1993 – Social Welfare (Consolidation) Act 1993
- No. 28/1993 – Presidential Elections Act 1993
- No. 29/1993 – Irish Aviation Authority Act 1993
- No. 30/1993 – European Parliament Elections Act 1993
- No. 31/1993 – Local Government (Dublin) Act 1993
- No. 32/1993 – Social Welfare (No. 2) Act 1993
- No. 33/1993 – Diplomatic and Consular Officers (Provision of Services) Act 1993
- No. 34/1993 – Merchant Shipping (Salvage and Wreck) Act 1993
- No. 35/1993 – Interpretation (Amendment) Act 1993
- No. 36/1993 – Irish Film Board (Amendment) Act 1993
- No. 37/1993 – Greyhound Industry (Amendment) Act 1993
- No. 38/1993 – Air Companies (Amendment) Act 1993
- No. 39/1993 – Appropriation Act 1993
- No. 40/1993 – Criminal Procedure Act 1993

Private Acts

- No. 1/1993 – The Altamont (Amendment of Deed of Trust) Act 1993

=== 1994 ===
- No. 1/1994 – Stillbirths Registration Act 1994
- No. 2/1994 – Criminal Justice (Public Order) Act 1994
- No. 3/1994 – Industrial Training (Apprenticeship Levy) Act 1994
- No. 4/1994 – Social Welfare Act 1994
- No. 5/1994 – Terms of Employment (Information) Act 1994
- No. 6/1994 – Extradition (Amendment) Act 1994
- No. 7/1994 – Road Traffic Act 1994
- No. 8/1994 – Local Government Act 1994
- No. 9/1994 – Irish Nationality and Citizenship Act 1994
- No. 10/1994 – Irish Shipping Limited (Payments To Former Employees) Act 1994
- No. 11/1994 – Health (Amendment) Act 1994
- No. 12/1994 – Referendum Act 1994
- No. 13/1994 – Finance Act 1994
- No. 14/1994 – Trade and Marketing Promotion (Amendment) Act 1994
- No. 15/1994 – Criminal Justice Act 1994
- No. 16/1994 – Health Insurance Act 1994
- No. 17/1994 – National Monuments (Amendment) Act 1994
- No. 18/1994 – Irish Horseracing Industry Act 1994
- No. 19/1994 – Dún Laoghaire Harbour Act 1994
- No. 20/1994 – Landlord and Tenant (Amendment) Act 1994
- No. 21/1994 – Oireachtas (Allowances To Members) (Amendment) Act 1994
- No. 22/1994 – An Bord Bia Act 1994
- No. 23/1994 – Fisheries (Amendment) Act 1994
- No. 24/1994 – Investment Limited Partnerships Act 1994
- No. 25/1994 – Milk (Regulation of Supply) Act 1994
- No. 26/1994 – Acc Bank Act 1994
- No. 27/1994 – Solicitors (Amendment) Act 1994
- No. 28/1994 – Maintenance Act 1994
- No. 29/1994 – Regional Technical Colleges (Amendment) Act 1994
- No. 30/1994 – European Communities (Amendment) Act 1994
- No. 31/1994 – Dublin Institute of Technology (Amendment) Act 1994
- No. 32/1994 – Select Committee on Legislation and Security of Dáil Éireann (Privilege and Immunity) Act 1994
- No. 33/1994 – Appropriation Act 1994
- No. 34/1994 – Maternity Protection Act 1994

=== 1995 ===
- No. 1/1995 – Ministers and Secretaries (Amendment) Act 1995
- No. 2/1995 – Adoptive Leave Act 1995
- No. 3/1995 – Social Welfare Act 1995
- No. 4/1995 – Heritage Act 1995
- No. 5/1995 – Regulation of Information (Services Outside the State For Termination of Pregnancies) Act 1995
- No. 6/1995 – European Communities (Amendment) Act 1995
- No. 7/1995 – Road Traffic Act 1995
- No. 8/1995 – Finance Act 1995
- No. 9/1995 – Stock Exchange Act 1995
- No. 10/1995 – Occupiers' Liability Act 1995
- No. 11/1995 – Investment Intermediaries Act 1995
- No. 12/1995 – Criminal Law (Incest Proceedings) Act 1995
- No. 13/1995 – Tourist Traffic Act 1995
- No. 14/1995 – Arterial Drainage (Amendment) Act 1995
- No. 15/1995 – Minerals Development Act 1995
- No. 16/1995 – Transfer of Sentenced Persons Act 1995
- No. 17/1995 – Package Holidays and Travel Trade Act 1995
- No. 18/1995 – Local Government (Delimitation of Water Supply Disconnection Powers) Act 1995
- No. 19/1995 – Casual Trading Act 1995
- No. 20/1995 – An Bord Bia (Amendment) Act 1995
- No. 21/1995 – Electoral (Amendment) Act 1995
- No. 22/1995 – Ethics in Public Office Act 1995
- No. 23/1995 – Social Welfare (No. 2) Act 1995
- No. 24/1995 – Consumer Credit Act 1995
- No. 25/1995 – Netting of Financial Contracts Act 1995
- No. 26/1995 – Family Law Act 1995
- No. 27/1995 – Fisheries (Amendment) Act 1995
- No. 28/1995 – Industrial Development Act 1995
- No. 29/1995 – Irish Medicines Board Act 1995
- No. 30/1995 – Securitisation (Proceeds of Certain Mortgages) Act 1995
- No. 31/1995 – Courts and Court Officers Act 1995
- No. 32/1995 – Civil Legal Aid Act 1995
- No. 33/1995 – Intoxicating Liquor Act 1995
- No. 34/1995 – Appropriation Act 1995
- No. 35/1995 – Energy (Miscellaneous Provisions) Act 1995
- No. 36/1995 – Milk (Regulation of Supply) (Amendment) Act 1995

Constitutional Amendments

- Fifteenth Amendment of the Constitution Act 1995

=== 1996 ===
- No. 1/1996 – Domestic Violence Act 1996
- No. 2/1996 – Johnstown Castle Agricultural College (Amendment) Act 1996
- No. 3/1996 – Commissioners of Public Works (Functions and Powers) Act 1996
- No. 4/1996 – Voluntary Health Insurance (Amendment) Act 1996
- No. 5/1996 – Bovine Diseases (Levies) (Amendment) Act 1996
- No. 6/1996 – Trade Marks Act 1996
- No. 7/1996 – Social Welfare Act 1996
- No. 8/1996 – Irish Steel Limited Act 1996
- No. 9/1996 – Finance Act 1996
- No. 10/1996 – Waste Management Act 1996
- No. 11/1996 – Harbours Act 1996
- No. 12/1996 – Powers of Attorney Act 1996
- No. 13/1996 – Civil Service Regulation (Amendment) Act 1996
- No. 14/1996 – Dumping At Sea Act 1996
- No. 15/1996 – Health (Amendment) Act 1996
- No. 16/1996 – Protection of Young Persons (Employment) Act 1996
- No. 17/1996 – Refugee Act 1996
- No. 18/1996 – Pensions (Amendment) Act 1996
- No. 19/1996 – Competition (Amendment) Act 1996
- No. 20/1996 – Transnational Information and Consultation of Employees Act 1996
- No. 21/1996 – An Bord Bia (Amendment) Act 1996
- No. 22/1996 – Borrowing Powers of Certain Bodies Act 1996
- No. 23/1996 – Health (Amendment) (No. 2) Act 1996
- No. 24/1996 – Transport (Dublin Light Rail) Act 1996
- No. 25/1996 – Disclosure of Certain Information For Taxation and Other Purposes Act 1996
- No. 26/1996 – Courts Act 1996
- No. 27/1996 – Metrology Act 1996
- No. 28/1996 – National Standards Authority of Ireland Act 1996
- No. 29/1996 – Criminal Justice (Drug Trafficking) Act 1996
- No. 30/1996 – Proceeds of Crime Act 1996
- No. 31/1996 – Criminal Assets Bureau Act 1996
- No. 32/1996 – Health (Amendment) (No. 3) Act 1996
- No. 33/1996 – Family Law (Divorce) Act 1996
- No. 34/1996 – Telecommunications (Miscellaneous Provisions) Act 1996
- No. 35/1996 – Merchant Shipping (Liability of Shipowners and Others) Act 1996
- No. 36/1996 – Registration of Births Act 1996
- No. 37/1996 – Control of Horses Act 1996
- No. 38/1996 – Sexual Offences (Jurisdiction) Act 1996
- No. 39/1996 – Oireachtas (Miscellaneous Provisions) and Ministerial and Parliamentary Offices (Amendment) Act 1996
- No. 40/1996 – Appropriation Act 1996
- No. 41/1996 – Milk (Regulation of Supply) (Amendment) Act 1996
- No. 42/1996 – Civil Liability (Amendment) Act 1996
- No. 43/1996 – Electoral (Amendment) Act 1996

Constitutional Amendments

- Sixteenth Amendment of the Constitution Act 1996

=== 1997 ===
- No. 1/1997 – Fisheries (Commissions) Act 1997
- No. 2/1997 – European Parliament Elections Act 1997
- No. 3/1997 – Decommissioning Act 1997
- No. 4/1997 – Criminal Justice (Miscellaneous Provisions) Act 1997
- No. 5/1997 – Irish Takeover Panel Act 1997
- No. 6/1997 – Courts Act 1997
- No. 7/1997 – Dublin Docklands Development Authority Act 1997
- No. 8/1997 – Central Bank Act 1997
- No. 9/1997 – Health (Provision of Information) Act 1997
- No. 10/1997 – Social Welfare Act 1997
- No. 11/1997 – National Cultural Institutions Act 1997
- No. 12/1997 – Litter Pollution Act 1997
- No. 13/1997 – Freedom of Information Act 1997
- No. 14/1997 – Criminal Law Act 1997
- No. 15/1997 – Credit Union Act 1997
- No. 16/1997 – Bail Act 1997
- No. 17/1997 – Committees of the Houses of the Oireachtas (Compellability, Privileges and Immunities of Witnesses) Act 1997
- No. 18/1997 – Family Law (Miscellaneous Provisions) Act 1997
- No. 19/1997 – International Development Association (Amendment) Act 1997
- No. 20/1997 – Organisation of Working Time Act 1997
- No. 21/1997 – Housing (Miscellaneous Provisions) Act 1997
- No. 22/1997 – Finance Act 1997
- No. 23/1997 – Fisheries (Amendment) Act 1997
- No. 24/1997 – Universities Act 1997
- No. 25/1997 – Electoral Act 1997
- No. 26/1997 – Non-Fatal Offences Against the Person Act 1997
- No. 27/1997 – Public Service Management Act 1997
- No. 28/1997 – Chemical Weapons Act 1997
- No. 29/1997 – Local Government (Financial Provisions) Act 1997
- No. 30/1997 – Youth Work Act 1997
- No. 31/1997 – Prompt Payment of Accounts Act 1997
- No. 32/1997 – ICC Bank (Amendment) Act 1997
- No. 33/1997 – Licensing (Combating Drug Abuse) Act 1997
- No. 34/1997 – Hepatitis C Compensation Tribunal Act 1997
- No. 35/1997 – Registration of Title (Amendment) Act 1997
- No. 36/1997 – Interpretation (Amendment) Act 1997
- No. 37/1997 – Merchant Shipping (Commissioners of Irish Lights) Act 1997
- No. 38/1997 – Europol Act 1997
- No. 39/1997 – Taxes Consolidation Act 1997
- No. 40/1997 – Children Act 1997
- No. 41/1997 – Transfer of Sentenced Persons (Amendment) Act 1997
- No. 42/1997 – Tribunals of Inquiry (Evidence) (Amendment) Act 1997
- No. 43/1997 – Courts (No. 2) Act 1997
- No. 44/1997 – Irish Film Board (Amendment) Act 1997
- No. 45/1997 – Appropriation Act 1997
- No. 46/1997 – Scientific and Technological Education (Investment) Fund Act 1997

Constitutional Amendments

- Seventeenth Amendment of the Constitution Act 1997

=== 1998 ===
- No. 1/1998 – Referendum Act 1998
- No. 2/1998 – Central Bank Act 1998
- No. 3/1998 – Finance Act 1998
- No. 4/1998 – Electoral (Amendment) Act 1998
- No. 5/1998 – Oireachtas (Allowances To Members) and Ministerial, Parliamentary, Judicial and Court Offices (Amendment) Act 1998
- No. 6/1998 – Social Welfare Act 1998
- No. 7/1998 – Minister For Arts, Heritage, Gaeltacht and the Islands (Powers and Functions) Act 1998
- No. 8/1998 – Courts Service Act 1998
- No. 9/1998 – Local Government (Planning and Development) Act 1998
- No. 10/1998 – Adoption Act 1998
- No. 11/1998 – Tribunals of Inquiry (Evidence) (Amendment) Act 1998
- No. 12/1998 – Civil Liability (Assessment of Hearing Injury) Act 1998
- No. 13/1998 – Oil Pollution of the Sea (Civil Liability and Compensation) (Amendment) Act 1998
- No. 14/1998 – Arbitration (International Commercial) Act 1998
- No. 15/1998 – Finance (No. 2) Act 1998
- No. 16/1998 – Local Government Act 1998
- No. 17/1998 – Gas (Amendment) Act 1998
- No. 18/1998 – Tribunals of Inquiry (Evidence) (Amendment) (No. 2) Act 1998
- No. 19/1998 – Electoral (Amendment) (No. 2) Act 1998
- No. 20/1998 – Merchant Shipping (Miscellaneous Provisions) Act 1998
- No. 21/1998 – Employment Equality Act 1998
- No. 22/1998 – Child Trafficking and Pornography Act 1998
- No. 23/1998 – Roads (Amendment) Act 1998
- No. 24/1998 – Air Navigation and Transport (Amendment) Act 1998
- No. 25/1998 – European Communities (Amendment) Act 1998
- No. 26/1998 – Turf Development Act 1998
- No. 27/1998 – Urban Renewal Act 1998
- No. 28/1998 – Intellectual Property (Miscellaneous Provisions) Act 1998
- No. 29/1998 – Food Safety Authority of Ireland Act 1998
- No. 30/1998 – Parental Leave Act 1998
- No. 31/1998 – Defence (Amendment) Act 1998
- No. 32/1998 – Firearms (Temporary Provisions) Act 1998
- No. 33/1998 – Housing (Traveller Accommodation) Act 1998
- No. 34/1998 – Industrial Development (Enterprise Ireland) Act 1998
- No. 35/1998 – Geneva Conventions (Amendment) Act 1998
- No. 36/1998 – Criminal Justice (Release of Prisoners) Act 1998
- No. 37/1998 – Investor Compensation Act 1998
- No. 38/1998 – Economic and Monetary Union Act 1998
- No. 39/1998 – Offences Against the State (Amendment) Act 1998
- No. 40/1998 – International War Crimes Tribunals Act 1998
- No. 41/1998 – Plant Varieties (Proprietary Rights) (Amendment) Act 1998
- No. 42/1998 – Western Development Commission Act 1998
- No. 43/1998 – Carriage of Dangerous Goods by Road Act 1998
- No. 44/1998 – State Property Act 1998
- No. 45/1998 – Tourist Traffic Act 1998
- No. 46/1998 – Voluntary Health Insurance (Amendment) Act 1998
- No. 47/1998 – Comptroller and Auditor General and Committees of the Houses of the Oireachtas (Special Provisions) Act 1998
- No. 48/1998 – Appropriation Act 1998
- No. 49/1998 – Protections For Persons Reporting Child Abuse Act 1998
- No. 50/1998 – George Mitchell Scholarship Fund Act 1998
- No. 51/1998 – Education Act 1998
- No. 52/1998 – Jurisdiction of Courts and Enforcement of Judgments Act 1998
- No. 53/1998 – Scientific and Technological Education (Investment) Fund (Amendment) Act 1998
- No. 54/1998 – Fisheries and Foreshore (Amendment) Act 1998

Constitutional Amendments

- Eighteenth Amendment of the Constitution Act 1998
- Nineteenth Amendment of the Constitution Act 1998

=== 1999 ===
- No. 1/1999 – British-Irish Agreement Act 1999
- No. 2/1999 – Finance Act 1999
- No. 3/1999 – Social Welfare Act 1999
- No. 4/1999 – Bretton Woods Agreements (Amendment) Act 1999
- No. 5/1999 – Postal and Telecommunications Services (Amendment) Act 1999
- No. 6/1999 – Irish Sports Council Act 1999
- No. 7/1999 – Local Elections (Disclosure of Donations and Expenditure) Act 1999
- No. 8/1999 – Companies (Amendment) Act 1999
- No. 9/1999 – Criminal Justice (Location of Victims' Remains) Act 1999
- No. 10/1999 – Criminal Justice Act 1999
- No. 11/1999 – Údarás na Gaeltachta (Amendment) Act 1999
- No. 12/1999 – Declaration under Article 29.7 of the Constitution (Extension of Time) Act 1999
- No. 13/1999 – Health (Eastern Regional Health Authority) Act 1999
- No. 14/1999 – National Disability Authority Act 1999
- No. 15/1999 – Road Transport Act 1999
- No. 16/1999 – British-Irish Agreement (Amendment) Act 1999
- No. 17/1999 – Local Government (Planning and Development) Act 1999
- No. 18/1999 – Sea Pollution (Amendment) Act 1999
- No. 19/1999 – Architectural Heritage (National Inventory) and Historic Monuments (Miscellaneous Provisions) Act 1999
- No. 20/1999 – Regional Technical Colleges (Amendment) Act 1999
- No. 21/1999 – Minerals Development Act 1999
- No. 22/1999 – Immigration Act 1999
- No. 23/1999 – Electricity Regulation Act 1999
- No. 24/1999 – Horse and Greyhound Racing (Betting Charges and Levies) Act 1999
- No. 25/1999 – Courts (Supplemental Provisions) (Amendment) Act 1999
- No. 26/1999 – Qualifications (Education and Training) Act 1999
- No. 27/1999 – Údarás na Gaeltachta (Amendment) (No. 2) Act 1999
- No. 28/1999 – Broadcasting (Major Events Television Coverage) Act 1999
- No. 29/1999 – ICC Bank Act 1999
- No. 30/1999 – Companies (Amendment) (No. 2) Act 1999
- No. 31/1999 – Stamp Duties Consolidation Act 1999
- No. 32/1999 – Intoxicating Liquor Act 1999
- No. 33/1999 – Temporary Holding Fund for Superannuation Liabilities Act 1999
- No. 34/1999 – Appropriation Act 1999
- No. 35/1999 – Fisheries (Amendment) Act 1999

Constitutional Amendments

- Twentieth Amendment of the Constitution Act 1999

== 2000–2009 ==
=== 2000 ===
- No. 1/2000 – Comhairle Act 2000
- No. 2/2000 – National Beef Assurance Scheme Act 2000
- No. 3/2000 – Finance Act 2000
- No. 4/2000 – Social Welfare Act 2000
- No. 5/2000 – National Minimum Wage Act 2000
- No. 6/2000 – Local Government (Financial Provisions) Act 2000
- No. 7/2000 – Commission To Inquire Into Child Abuse Act 2000
- No. 8/2000 – Equal Status Act 2000
- No. 9/2000 – Human Rights Commission Act 2000
- No. 10/2000 – Multilateral Investment Guarantee Agency (Amendment) Act 2000
- No. 11/2000 – Criminal Justice (United Nations Convention Against Torture) Act 2000
- No. 12/2000 – International Development Association (Amendment) Act 2000
- No. 13/2000 – Statute of Limitations (Amendment) Act 2000
- No. 14/2000 – Merchant Shipping (Investigation of Marine Casualties) Act 2000
- No. 15/2000 – Courts (Supplemental Provisions) (Amendment) Act 2000
- No. 16/2000 – Criminal Justice (Safety of United Nations Workers) Act 2000
- No. 17/2000 – Intoxicating Liquor Act 2000
- No. 18/2000 – Town Renewal Act 2000
- No. 19/2000 – Finance (No. 2) Act 2000
- No. 20/2000 – Firearms (Firearm Certificates For Non-Residents) Act 2000
- No. 21/2000 – Harbours (Amendment) Act 2000
- No. 22/2000 – Education (Welfare) Act 2000
- No. 23/2000 – Hospitals' Trust (1940) Limited (Payments To Former Employees) Act 2000
- No. 24/2000 – Medical Practitioners (Amendment) Act 2000
- No. 25/2000 – Local Government Act 2000
- No. 26/2000 – Gas (Amendment) Act 2000
- No. 27/2000 – Electronic Commerce Act 2000
- No. 28/2000 – Copyright and Related Rights Act 2000
- No. 29/2000 – Illegal Immigrants (Trafficking) Act 2000
- No. 30/2000 – Planning and Development Act 2000
- No. 31/2000 – Cement (Repeal of Enactments) Act 2000
- No. 32/2000 – ICC Bank Act 2000
- No. 33/2000 – National Pensions Reserve Fund Act 2000
- No. 34/2000 – Fisheries (Amendment) Act 2000
- No. 35/2000 – Irish Film Board (Amendment) Act 2000
- No. 36/2000 – Appropriation Act 2000
- No. 37/2000 – Protection of Children (Hague Convention) Act 2000
- No. 38/2000 – Wildlife (Amendment) Act 2000
- No. 39/2000 – National Treasury Management Agency (Amendment) Act 2000
- No. 40/2000 – National Stud (Amendment) Act 2000
- No. 41/2000 – National Training Fund Act 2000
- No. 42/2000 – Insurance Act 2000

Private Acts

- No. 1/2000 – The Trinity College, Dublin (Charters and Letters Patent Amendment) Act 2000

=== 2001 ===
- No. 1/2001 – Aviation Regulation Act 2001
- No. 2/2001 – Customs and Excise (Mutual Assistance) Act 2001
- No. 3/2001 – Diseases of Animals (Amendment) Act 2001
- No. 4/2001 – Broadcasting Act 2001
- No. 5/2001 – Social Welfare Act 2001
- No. 6/2001 – Trustee Savings Banks (Amendment) Act 2001
- No. 7/2001 – Finance Act 2001
- No. 8/2001 – Teaching Council Act 2001
- No. 9/2001 – Electricity (Supply) (Amendment) Act 2001
- No. 10/2001 – Housing (Gaeltacht) (Amendment) Act 2001
- No. 11/2001 – Industrial Relations (Amendment) Act 2001
- No. 12/2001 – Acc Bank Act 2001
- No. 13/2001 – Valuation Act 2001
- No. 14/2001 – Health (Miscellaneous Provisions) Act 2001
- No. 15/2001 – Irish Nationality and Citizenship Act 2001
- No. 16/2001 – Euro Changeover (Amounts) Act 2001
- No. 17/2001 – Health Insurance (Amendment) Act 2001
- No. 18/2001 – Sex Offenders Act 2001
- No. 19/2001 – Carer's Leave Act 2001
- No. 20/2001 – Horse and Greyhound Racing Act 2001
- No. 21/2001 – Nítrigin Éireann Teoranta Act 2001
- No. 22/2001 – Motor Vehicle (Duties and Licences) Act 2001
- No. 23/2001 – Vocational Education (Amendment) Act 2001
- No. 24/2001 – Children Act 2001
- No. 25/2001 – Mental Health Act 2001
- No. 26/2001 – Irish National Petroleum Corporation Limited Act 2001
- No. 27/2001 – Prevention of Corruption (Amendment) Act 2001
- No. 28/2001 – Company Law Enforcement Act 2001
- No. 29/2001 – Agriculture Appeals Act 2001
- No. 30/2001 – Oireachtas (Ministerial and Parliamentary Offices) (Amendment) Act 2001
- No. 31/2001 – Standards in Public Office Act 2001
- No. 32/2001 – Dormant Accounts Act 2001
- No. 33/2001 – Ministerial, Parliamentary and Judicial Offices and Oireachtas Members (Miscellaneous Provisions) Act 2001
- No. 34/2001 – Adventure Activities Standards Authority Act 2001
- No. 35/2001 – Human Rights Commission (Amendment) Act 2001
- No. 36/2001 – Waste Management (Amendment) Act 2001
- No. 37/2001 – Local Government Act 2001
- No. 38/2001 – Electoral (Amendment) Act 2001
- No. 39/2001 – Industrial Designs Act 2001
- No. 40/2001 – Fisheries (Amendment) Act 2001
- No. 41/2001 – European Communities and Swiss Confederation Act 2001
- No. 42/2001 – Youth Work Act 2001
- No. 43/2001 – Ordnance Survey Ireland Act 2001
- No. 44/2001 – Heritage Fund Act 2001
- No. 45/2001 – Protection of Employees (Part-Time Work) Act 2001
- No. 46/2001 – Horse Racing Ireland (Membership) Act 2001
- No. 47/2001 – Asset Covered Securities Act 2001
- No. 48/2001 – Air Navigation and Transport (Indemnities) Act 2001
- No. 49/2001 – Extradition (European Union Conventions) Act 2001
- No. 50/2001 – Criminal Justice (Theft and Fraud Offences) Act 2001
- No. 51/2001 – Social Welfare (No. 2) Act 2001
- No. 52/2001 – Appropriation Act 2001
- No. 53/2001 – Referendum Act 2001
- No. 54/2001 – Family Support Agency Act 2001
- No. 55/2001 – Transport (Railway Infrastructure) Act 2001

Constitutional Amendments

- Twenty-first Amendment of the Constitution Act 2001
- Twenty-third Amendment of the Constitution Act 2001

=== 2002 ===
- No. 1/2002 – State Authorities (Public Private Partnership Arrangements) Act 2002
- No. 2/2002 – Sustainable Energy Act 2002
- No. 3/2002 – Radiological Protection (Amendment) Act 2002
- No. 4/2002 – Electoral (Amendment) Act 2002
- No. 5/2002 – Finance Act 2002
- No. 6/2002 – Public Health (Tobacco) Act 2002
- No. 7/2002 – Tribunals of Inquiry (Evidence) (Amendment) Act 2002
- No. 8/2002 – Social Welfare (Miscellaneous Provisions) Act 2002
- No. 9/2002 – Housing (Miscellaneous Provisions) Act 2002
- No. 10/2002 – Gas (Interim) (Regulation) Act 2002
- No. 11/2002 – Arramara Teoranta (Acquisition of Shares) Act 2002
- No. 12/2002 – Road Traffic Act 2002
- No. 13/2002 – Residential Institutions Redress Act 2002
- No. 14/2002 – Competition Act 2002
- No. 15/2002 – Courts and Court Officers Act 2002
- No. 16/2002 – Civil Defence Act 2002
- No. 17/2002 – Medical Practitioners (Amendment) Act 2002
- No. 18/2002 – Pensions (Amendment) Act 2002
- No. 19/2002 – Solicitors (Amendment) Act 2002
- No. 20/2002 – Communications Regulation Act 2002
- No. 21/2002 – Hepatitis C Compensation Tribunal (Amendment) Act 2002
- No. 22/2002 – Ombudsman For Children Act 2002
- No. 23/2002 – Electoral (Amendment) (No. 2) Act 2002
- No. 24/2002 – Minister For the Environment and Local Government (Performance of Certain Functions) Act 2002
- No. 25/2002 – European Union (Scrutiny) Act 2002
- No. 26/2002 – British-Irish Agreement (Amendment) Act 2002
- No. 27/2002 – European Communities (Amendment) Act 2002
- No. 28/2002 – Appropriation Act 2002
- No. 29/2002 – National Development Finance Agency Act 2002
- No. 30/2002 – Domestic Violence (Amendment) Act 2002
- No. 31/2002 – Social Welfare Act 2002
- No. 32/2002 – Planning and Development (Amendment) Act 2002
- No. 33/2002 – Statute Law (Restatement) Act 2002

Constitutional Amendments

- Twenty-sixth Amendment of the Constitution Act 2002

=== 2003 ===
- No. 1/2003 – Capital Acquisitions Tax Consolidation Act 2003
- No. 2/2003 – Unclaimed Life Assurance Policies Act 2003
- No. 3/2003 – Finance Act 2003
- No. 4/2003 – Social Welfare (Miscellaneous Provisions) Act 2003
- No. 5/2003 – Motor Vehicle (Duties and Licences) Act 2003
- No. 6/2003 – Data Protection (Amendment) Act 2003
- No. 7/2003 – Employment Permits Act 2003
- No. 8/2003 – Local Government Act 2003
- No. 9/2003 – Freedom of Information (Amendment) Act 2003
- No. 10/2003 – National Tourism Development Authority Act 2003
- No. 11/2003 – Health Insurance (Amendment) Act 2003
- No. 12/2003 – Central Bank and Financial Services Authority of Ireland Act 2003
- No. 13/2003 – Broadcasting (Major Events Television Coverage) (Amendment) Act 2003
- No. 14/2003 – Redundancy Payments Act 2003
- No. 15/2003 – Licensing of Indoor Events Act 2003
- No. 16/2003 – Criminal Justice (Public Order) Act 2003
- No. 17/2003 – Local Government (No. 2) Act 2003
- No. 18/2003 – Criminal Justice (Illicit Traffic by Sea) Act 2003
- No. 19/2003 – Garda Síochána (Police Co-Operation) Act 2003
- No. 20/2003 – European Convention on Human Rights Act 2003
- No. 21/2003 – Fisheries (Amendment) Act 2003
- No. 22/2003 – Opticians (Amendment) Act 2003
- No. 23/2003 – Digital Hub Development Agency Act 2003
- No. 24/2003 – Arts Act 2003
- No. 25/2003 – Taxi Regulation Act 2003
- No. 26/2003 – Immigration Act 2003
- No. 27/2003 – Protection of the Environment Act 2003
- No. 28/2003 – Houses of the Oireachtas Commission Act 2003
- No. 29/2003 – Protection of Employees (Fixed-Term Work) Act 2003
- No. 30/2003 – Industrial Development (Science Foundation Ireland) Act 2003
- No. 31/2003 – Intoxicating Liquor Act 2003
- No. 32/2003 – Official Languages Act 2003
- No. 33/2003 – Oil Pollution of the Sea (Civil Liability and Compensation) (Amendment) Act 2003
- No. 34/2003 – Criminal Justice (Temporary Release of Prisoners) Act 2003
- No. 35/2003 – Containment of Nuclear Weapons Act 2003
- No. 36/2003 – Courts and Court Officers (Amendment) Act 2003
- No. 37/2003 – Road Traffic Act 2003
- No. 38/2003 – European Communities (Amendment) Act 2003
- No. 39/2003 – Minister for Community, Rural and Gaeltacht Affairs (Powers and Functions) Act 2003
- No. 40/2003 – Independent Monitoring Commission Act 2003
- No. 41/2003 – Social Welfare Act 2003
- No. 42/2003 – Appropriation Act 2003
- No. 43/2003 – Broadcasting (Funding) Act 2003
- No. 44/2003 – Companies (Auditing and Accounting) Act 2003
- No. 45/2003 – European Arrest Warrant Act 2003
- No. 46/2003 – Personal Injuries Assessment Board Act 2003

Private Acts

- No. 1/2003 – The Royal College of Surgeons in Ireland (Charters Amendment) Act 2003

=== 2004 ===
- No. 1/2004 – Immigration Act 2004
- No. 2/2004 – European Parliament Elections (Amendment) Act 2004
- No. 3/2004 – Civil Registration Act 2004
- No. 4/2004 – Industrial Relations (Miscellaneous Provisions) Act 2004
- No. 5/2004 – Motor Vehicle (Duties and Licences) Act 2004
- No. 6/2004 – Public Health (Tobacco) (Amendment) Act 2004
- No. 7/2004 – Public Service Superannuation (Miscellaneous Provisions) Act 2004
- No. 8/2004 – Finance Act 2004
- No. 9/2004 – Social Welfare (Miscellaneous Provisions) Act 2004
- No. 10/2004 – Aer Lingus Act 2004
- No. 11/2004 – Air Navigation and Transport (International Conventions) Act 2004
- No. 12/2004 – Private Security Services Act 2004
- No. 13/2004 – Tribunals of Inquiry (Evidence) (Amendment) Act 2004
- No. 14/2004 – An Bord Bia (Amendment) Act 2004
- No. 15/2004 – Electoral (Amendment) Act 2004
- No. 16/2004 – Committees of the Houses of the Oireachtas (Compellability, Privileges and Immunities of Witnesses) (Amendment) Act 2004
- No. 17/2004 – Child Trafficking and Pornography (Amendment) Act 2004
- No. 18/2004 – Copyright and Related Rights(Amendment) Act 2004
- No. 19/2004 – Health (Amendment) Act 2004
- No. 20/2004 – Criminal Justice (Joint Investigation Teams) Act 2004
- No. 21/2004 – Central Bank and Financial Services Authority of Ireland Act 2004
- No. 22/2004 – National Monuments (Amendment) Act 2004
- No. 23/2004 – Commissions of Investigation Act 2004
- No. 24/2004 – Equality Act 2004
- No. 25/2004 – Electricity (Supply) (Amendment) Act 2004
- No. 26/2004 – International Development Association (Amendment) Act 2004
- No. 27/2004 – Residential Tenancies Act 2004
- No. 28/2004 – Maternity Protection (Amendment) Act 2004
- No. 29/2004 – Maritime Security Act 2004
- No. 30/2004 – Education for Persons with Special Educational Needs Act 2004
- No. 31/2004 – Civil Liability and Courts Act 2004
- No. 32/2004 – State Airports Act 2004
- No. 33/2004 – Public Service Management (Recruitment and Appointments) Act 2004
- No. 34/2004 – Intoxicating Liquor Act 2004
- No. 35/2004 – Dumping at Sea (Amendment) Act 2004
- No. 36/2004 – Ombudsman (Defence Forces) Act 2004
- No. 37/2004 – Council of Europe Development Bank Act 2004
- No. 38/2004 – Irish Nationality and Citizenship Act 2004
- No. 39/2004 – Tribunal of Inquiry into Certain Planning Matters and Payments Act 2004
- No. 40/2004 – Appropriation Act 2004
- No. 41/2004 – Social Welfare Act 2004
- No. 42/2004 – Health Act 2004
- No. 43/2004 – Housing (Miscellaneous Provisions) Act 2004
- No. 44/2004 – Road Traffic Act 2004

Constitutional Amendments

- Twenty-seventh Amendment of the Constitution Act 2004

=== 2005 ===
- No. 1/2005 – Proceeds of Crime (Amendment) Act 2005
- No. 2/2005 – Criminal Justice (Terrorist Offences) Act 2005
- No. 3/2005 – Health (Amendment) Act 2005
- No. 4/2005 – Social Welfare and Pensions Act 2005
- No. 5/2005 – Finance Act 2005
- No. 6/2005 – British-Irish Agreement (Amendment) Act 2005
- No. 7/2005 – Landlord and Tenant (Ground Rents) Act 2005
- No. 8/2005 – Dormant Accounts (Amendment) Act 2005
- No. 9/2005 – Sea Pollution (Hazardous Substances) (Compensation) Act 2005
- No. 10/2005 – Safety, Health and Welfare at Work Act 2005
- No. 11/2005 – Maritime Safety Act 2005
- No. 12/2005 – Investment Funds, Companies and Miscellaneous Provisions Act 2005
- No. 13/2005 – Air Navigation and Transport (Indemnities) Act 2005
- No. 14/2005 – Disability Act 2005
- No. 15/2005 – International Interests in Mobile Equipment (Cape Town Convention) Act 2005
- No. 16/2005 – Electoral (Amendment) Act 2005
- No. 17/2005 – Commission to Inquire into Child Abuse (Amendment) Act 2005
- No. 18/2005 – Civil Service Regulation (Amendment) Act 2005
- No. 19/2005 – Civil Registration (Amendment) Act 2005
- No. 20/2005 – Garda Síochána Act 2005
- No. 21/2005 – Grangegorman Development Agency Act 2005
- No. 22/2005 – Veterinary Practice Act 2005
- No. 23/2005 – Interpretation Act 2005
- No. 24/2005 – Land Act 2005
- No. 25/2005 – Adoptive Leave Act 2005
- No. 26/2005 – Social Welfare Consolidation Act 2005
- No. 27/2005 – Health and Social Care Professionals Act 2005
- No. 28/2005 – Transfer of Execution of Sentences Act 2005
- No. 29/2005 – Appropriation Act 2005
- No. 30/2005 – Social Welfare Act 2005
- No. 31/2005 – Railway Safety Act 2005
- No. 32/2005 – Statute Law Revision (Pre-1922) Act 2005
- No. 33/2005 – Coroners (Amendment) Act 2005
- No. 34/2005 – Development Banks Act 2005

=== 2006 ===
- No. 1/2006 – University College Galway (Amendment) Act 2006
- No. 2/2006 – Teaching Council (Amendment) Act 2006
- No. 3/2006 – Irish Medicines Board (Miscellaneous Provisions) Act 2006
- No. 4/2006 – Competition (Amendment) Act 2006
- No. 5/2006 – Social Welfare Law Reform and Pensions Act 2006
- No. 6/2006 – Finance Act 2006
- No. 7/2006 – Aviation Act 2006
- No. 8/2006 – Sea-Fisheries and Maritime Jurisdiction Act 2006
- No. 9/2006 – Employees (Provision of Information and Consultation) Act 2006
- No. 10/2006 – Diplomatic Relations and Immunities (Amendment) Act 2006
- No. 11/2006 – Criminal Law (Insanity) Act 2006
- No. 12/2006 – Registration of Deeds and Title Act 2006
- No. 13/2006 – Parental Leave (Amendment) Act 2006
- No. 14/2006 – Road Safety Authority Act 2006
- No. 15/2006 – Criminal Law (Sexual Offences) Act 2006
- No. 16/2006 – Employment Permits Act 2006
- No. 17/2006 – Health (Repayment Scheme) Act 2006
- No. 18/2006 – European Communities (Amendment) Act 2006
- No. 19/2006 – National Sports Campus Development Authority Act 2006
- No. 20/2006 – Defence (Amendment) Act 2006
- No. 21/2006 – National Economic and Social Development Office Act 2006
- No. 22/2006 – Hepatitis C Compensation Tribunal (Amendment) Act 2006
- No. 23/2006 – Road Traffic Act 2006
- No. 24/2006 – Building Societies (Amendment) Act 2006
- No. 25/2006 – Institutes of Technology Act 2006
- No. 26/2006 – Criminal Justice Act 2006
- No. 27/2006 – Planning and Development (Strategic Infrastructure) Act 2006
- No. 28/2006 – Road Traffic and Transport Act 2006
- No. 29/2006 – Sea Pollution (Miscellaneous Provisions) Act 2006
- No. 30/2006 – International Criminal Court Act 2006
- No. 31/2006 – Patents (Amendment) Act 2006
- No. 32/2006 – British-Irish Agreement (Amendment) Act 2006
- No. 33/2006 – Electoral (Amendment) Act 2006
- No. 34/2006 – Industrial Development Act 2006
- No. 35/2006 – Appropriation Act 2006
- No. 36/2006 – Social Welfare Act 2006
- No. 37/2006 – Europol (Amendment) Act 2006
- No. 38/2006 – Irish Film Board (Amendment) Act 2006
- No. 39/2006 – Houses of the Oireachtas Commission (Amendment) Act 2006
- No. 40/2006 – Energy (Miscellaneous Provisions) Act 2006
- No. 41/2006 – Investment Funds, Companies and Miscellaneous Provisions Act 2006
- No. 42/2006 – Local Government (Business Improvement Districts) Act 2006

=== 2007 ===
- No. 1/2007 – Health (Nursing Homes) (Amendment) Act 2007
- No. 2/2007 – Citizens Information Act 2007
- No. 3/2007 – Health Insurance (Amendment) Act 2007
- No. 4/2007 – Courts and Court Officers (Amendment) Act 2007
- No. 5/2007 – Electricity Regulation (Amendment) (Single Electricity Market) Act 2007
- No. 6/2007 – Criminal Law (Sexual Offences) (Amendment) Act 2007
- No. 7/2007 – National Oil Reserves Agency Act 2007
- No. 8/2007 – Social Welfare and Pensions Act 2007
- No. 9/2007 – Education (Miscellaneous Provisions) Act 2007
- No. 10/2007 – Prisons Act 2007
- No. 11/2007 – Finance Act 2007
- No. 12/2007 – Carbon Fund Act 2007
- No. 13/2007 – Asset Covered Securities (Amendment) Act 2007
- No. 14/2007 – Electoral (Amendment) Act 2007
- No. 15/2007 – Broadcasting (Amendment) Act 2007
- No. 16/2007 – National Development Finance Agency (Amendment) Act 2007
- No. 17/2007 – Foyle and Carlingford Fisheries Act 2007
- No. 18/2007 – European Communities Act 2007
- No. 19/2007 – Consumer Protection Act 2007
- No. 20/2007 – Pharmacy Act 2007
- No. 21/2007 – Building Control Act 2007
- No. 22/2007 – Communications Regulation (Amendment) Act 2007
- No. 23/2007 – Health Act 2007
- No. 24/2007 – Defence (Amendment) Act 2007
- No. 25/2007 – Medical Practitioners Act 2007
- No. 26/2007 – Child Care (Amendment) Act 2007
- No. 27/2007 – Protection of Employment (Exceptional Collective Redundancies and Related Matters) Act 2007
- No. 28/2007 – Statute Law Revision Act 2007
- No. 29/2007 – Criminal Justice Act 2007
- No. 30/2007 – Water Services Act 2007
- No. 31/2007 – Finance (No. 2) Act 2007
- No. 32/2007 – Community, Rural and Gaeltacht Affairs (Miscellaneous Provisions) Act 2007
- No. 33/2007 – Ministers and Secretaries (Ministers of State) Act 2007
- No. 34/2007 – Roads Act 2007
- No. 35/2007 – Personal Injuries Assessment Board (Amendment) Act 2007
- No. 36/2007 – Criminal Procedure (Amendment) Act 2007
- No. 37/2007 – Markets in Financial Instruments and Miscellaneous Provisions Act 2007
- No. 38/2007 – Local Government (Roads Functions) Act 2007
- No. 39/2007 – Copyright and Related Rights (Amendment) Act 2007
- No. 40/2007 – Social Welfare Act 2007
- No. 41/2007 – Appropriation Act 2007
- No. 42/2007 – Health (Miscellaneous Provisions) Act 2007

=== 2008 ===
- No. 1/2008 – Control of Exports Act 2008
- No. 2/2008 – Social Welfare and Pensions Act 2008
- No. 3/2008 – Finance Act 2008
- No. 4/2008 – Passports Act 2008
- No. 5/2008 – Motor Vehicle (Duties and Licences) Act 2008
- No. 6/2008 – Voluntary Health Insurance (Amendment) Act 2008
- No. 7/2008 – Criminal Justice (Mutual Assistance) Act 2008
- No. 8/2008 – Criminal Law (Human Trafficking) Act 2008
- No. 9/2008 – Local Government Services (Corporate Bodies) (Confirmation of Orders) Act 2008
- No. 10/2008 – Prison Development (Confirmation of Resolutions) Act 2008
- No. 11/2008 – Electricity Regulation (Amendment) (Eirgrid) Act 2008
- No. 12/2008 – An tAcht na nDlí-Chleactóirí (An Ghaelige) 2008
- No. 12/2008 – Legal Practitioners (Irish Language) Act 2008
- No. 13/2008 – Chemicals Act 2008
- No. 14/2008 – Civil Law (Miscellaneous Provisions) Act 2008
- No. 15/2008 – Dublin Transport Authority Act 2008
- No. 16/2008 – Nuclear Test Ban Act 2008
- No. 17/2008 – Intoxicating Liquor Act 2008
- No. 18/2008 – Credit Institutions (Financial Support) Act 2008
- No. 19/2008 – Mental Health Act 2008
- No. 20/2008 – Cluster Munitions And Anti-Personnel Mines Act 2008
- No. 21/2008 – Health Act 2008
- No. 22/2008 – Social Welfare (Miscellaneous Provisions) Act 2008
- No. 23/2008 – Appropriation Act 2008
- No. 24/2008 – Motor Vehicle (Duties and Licences) (No. 2) Act 2008
- No. 25/2008 – Finance (No. 2) Act 2008

=== 2009 ===
- No. 1/2009 – Anglo Irish Bank Corporation Act 2009
- No. 2/2009 – Residential Tenancies (Amendment) Act 2009
- No. 3/2009 – Gas (Amendment) Act 2009
- No. 4/2009 – Electoral (Amendment) Act 2009
- No. 5/2009 – Financial Emergency Measures in the Public Interest Act 2009
- No. 6/2009 – Charities Act 2009
- No. 7/2009 – Investment of the National Pensions Reserve Fund and Miscellaneous Provisions Act 2009
- No. 8/2009 – Legal Services Ombudsman Act 2009
- No. 9/2009 – Electoral (Amendment) (No. 2) Act 2009
- No. 10/2009 – Social Welfare and Pensions Act 2009
- No. 11/2009 – Industrial Development Act 2009
- No. 12/2009 – Finance Act 2009
- No. 13/2009 – Financial Services (Deposit Guarantee Scheme) Act 2009
- No. 14/2009 – Financial Measures (Miscellaneous Provisions) Act 2009
- No. 15/2009 – Nursing Homes Support Scheme Act 2009
- No. 16/2009 – Aviation (Preclearance) Act 2009
- No. 17/2009 – European Parliament (Irish Constituency Members) Act 2009
- No. 18/2009 – Broadcasting Act 2009
- No. 19/2009 – Criminal Justice (Surveillance) Act 2009
- No. 20/2009 – Companies (Amendment) Act 2009
- No. 21/2009 – Enforcement of Court Orders (Amendment) Act 2009
- No. 22/2009 – Housing (Miscellaneous Provisions) Act 2009
- No. 23/2009 – Public Health (Tobacco) (Amendment) Act 2009
- No. 24/2009 – Health Insurance (Miscellaneous Provisions) Act 2009
- No. 25/2009 – Health (Miscellaneous Provisions) Act 2009
- No. 26/2009 – Harbours (Amendment) Act 2009
- No. 27/2009 – Land and Conveyancing Law Reform Act 2009
- No. 28/2009 – Criminal Justice (Miscellaneous Provisions) Act 2009
- No. 29/2009 – Oireachtas (Allowances to Members) and Ministerial and Parliamentary Offices Act 2009
- No. 30/2009 – Local Government (Charges) Act 2009
- No. 31/2009 – Defamation Act 2009
- No. 32/2009 – Criminal Justice (Amendment) Act 2009
- No. 33/2009 – European Union Act 2009
- No. 34/2009 – National Asset Management Agency Act 2009
- No. 35/2009 – Defence (Miscellaneous Provisions) Act 2009
- No. 36/2009 – Courts and Court Officers Act 2009
- No. 37/2009 – Public Transport Regulation Act 2009
- No. 38/2009 – Labour Services (Amendment) Act 2009
- No. 39/2009 – Foreshore And Dumping At Sea (Amendment) Act 2009
- No. 40/2009 – Forestry (Amendment) Act 2009
- No. 41/2009 – Financial Emergency Measures in the Public Interest (No. 2) Act 2009
- No. 42/2009 – Appropriation Act 2009
- No. 43/2009 – Social Welfare And Pensions (No. 2) Act 2009
- No. 44/2009 – Houses of the Oireachtas Commission (Amendment) Act 2009
- No. 45/2009 – Companies (Miscellaneous Provisions) Act 2009
- No. 46/2009 – Statute Law Revision Act 2009

Constitutional Amendments

- Twenty-eighth Amendment of the Constitution (Treaty of Lisbon) Act 2009

== 2010–2019 ==
=== 2010 ===
- No. 1/2010 – Arbitration Act 2010
- No. 2/2010 – Communications Regulation (Premium Rate Services and Electronic Communications Infrastructure) Act 2010
- No. 3/2010 – George Mitchell Scholarship Fund (Amendment) Act 2010
- No. 4/2010 – Petroleum (Exploration and Extraction) Safety Act 2010
- No. 5/2010 – Finance Act 2010
- No. 6/2010 – Criminal Justice (Money Laundering and Terrorist Financing) Act 2010
- No. 7/2010 – Euro Area Loan Facility Act 2010
- No. 8/2010 – Fines Act 2010
- No. 9/2010 – Intoxicating Liquor (National Conference Centre) Act 2010
- No. 10/2010 – Inland Fisheries Act 2010
- No. 11/2010 – Energy (Biofuel Obligation and Miscellaneous Provisions) Act 2010
- No. 12/2010 – Competition (Amendment) Act 2010
- No. 13/2010 – Electricity Regulation (Amendment) (Carbon Revenue Levy) Act 2010
- No. 14/2010 – Merchant Shipping Act 2010
- No. 15/2010 – Health (Amendment) Act 2010
- No. 16/2010 – European Financial Stability Facility Act 2010
- No. 17/2010 – Compulsory Purchase Orders (Extension of Time Limits) Act 2010
- No. 18/2010 – Health (Miscellaneous Provisions) Act 2010
- No. 19/2010 – Wildlife (Amendment) Act 2010
- No. 20/2010 – Health (Amendment) (No. 2) Act 2010
- No. 21/2010 – Adoption Act 2010
- No. 22/2010 – Criminal Justice (Psychoactive Substances) Act 2010
- No. 23/2010 – Central Bank Reform Act 2010
- No. 24/2010 – Civil Partnership and Certain Rights and Obligations of Cohabitants Act 2010
- No. 25/2010 – Road Traffic Act 2010
- No. 26/2010 – Údarás na Gaeltachta (Amendment) Act 2010
- No. 27/2010 – Criminal Procedure Act 2010
- No. 28/2010 – Social Welfare (Miscellaneous Provisions) Act 2010
- No. 29/2010 – Dog Breeding Establishments Act 2010
- No. 30/2010 – Planning and Development (Amendment) Act 2010
- No. 31/2010 – Value-Added Tax Consolidation Act 2010
- No. 32/2010 – Chemicals (Amendment) Act 2010
- No. 33/2010 – Prevention of Corruption (Amendment) Act 2010
- No. 34/2010 – Social Welfare Act 2010
- No. 35/2010 – Appropriation Act 2010
- No. 36/2010 – Credit Institutions (Stabilisation) Act 2010
- No. 37/2010 – Social Welfare and Pensions Act 2010
- No. 38/2010 – Financial Emergency Measures in the Public Interest Act 2010
- No. 39/2010 – Public Health (Tobacco) (Amendment) Act 2010
- No. 40/2010 – Criminal Law (Insanity) Act 2010

=== 2011 ===
- No. 1/2011 – Bretton Woods Agreements (Amendment) Act 2011
- No. 2/2011 – Multi-Unit Developments Act 2011
- No. 3/2011 – Communications (Retention of Data) Act 2011
- No. 4/2011 – Student Support Act 2011
- No. 5/2011 – Criminal Justice (Public Order) Act 2011
- No. 6/2011 – Finance Act 2011
- No. 7/2011 – Road Traffic Act 2011
- No. 8/2011 – Finance (No. 2) Act 2011
- No. 9/2011 – Social Welfare and Pensions Act 2011
- No. 10/2011 – Ministers and Secretaries (Amendment) Act 2011
- No. 11/2011 – Foreshore (Amendment) Act 2011
- No. 12/2011 – Medical Practitioners (Amendment) Act 2011
- No. 13/2011 – Biological Weapons Act 2011
- No. 14/2011 – Electoral (Amendment) Act 2011
- No. 15/2011 – Public Health (Tobacco) (Amendment) Act 2011
- No. 16/2011 – Residential Institutions Redress (Amendment) Act 2011
- No. 17/2011 – Defence (Amendment) Act 2011
- No. 18/2011 – Finance (No. 3) Act 2011
- No. 19/2011 – Child Care (Amendment) Act 2011
- No. 20/2011 – Environment (Miscellaneous Provisions) Act 2011
- No. 21/2011 – Communications Regulation (Postal Services) Act 2011
- No. 22/2011 – Criminal Justice Act 2011
- No. 23/2011 – Civil Law (Miscellaneous Provisions) Act 2011
- No. 24/2011 – Criminal Justice (Community Service) (Amendment) Act 2011
- No. 25/2011 – European Financial Stability Facility and Euro Area Loan Facility (Amendment) Act 2011
- No. 26/2011 – Insurance (Amendment) Act 2011
- No. 27/2011 – Central Bank and Credit Institutions (Resolution) Act 2011
- No. 28/2011 – Road Traffic (No. 2) Act 2011
- No. 29/2011 – Welfare of Greyhounds Act 2011
- No. 30/2011 – Access to Central Treasury Funds (Commission for Energy Regulation) Act 2011
- No. 31/2011 – Road Transport Act 2011
- No. 32/2011 – Irish Film Board (Amendment) Act 2011
- No. 33/2011 – National Tourism Development Authority (Amendment) Act 2011
- No. 34/2011 – Health Insurance (Miscellaneous Provisions) Act 2011
- No. 35/2011 – Criminal Law (Defence and the Dwelling) Act 2011
- No. 36/2011 – Local Government (Household Charge) Act 2011
- No. 37/2011 – Social Welfare Act 2011
- No. 38/2011 – Appropriation Act 2011
- No. 39/2011 – Financial Emergency Measures in the Public Interest (Amendment) Act 2011
- No. 40/2011 – Property Services (Regulation) Act 2011
- No. 41/2011 – Nurses and Midwives Act 2011

Constitutional Amendments

- Twenty-ninth Amendment of the Constitution Act 2011

=== 2012 ===
- No. 1/2012 – Patents (Amendment) Act 2012
- No. 2/2012 – Water Services (Amendment) Act 2012
- No. 3/2012 – Energy (Miscellaneous Provisions) Act 2012
- No. 4/2012 – Health (Provision of General Practitioner Services) Act 2012
- No. 5/2012 – Bretton Woods Agreements (Amendment) Act 2012
- No. 6/2012 – Euro Area Loan Facility (Amendment) Act 2012
- No. 7/2012 – Jurisdiction of Courts and Enforcement of Judgments (Amendment) Act 2012
- No. 8/2012 – Clotting Factor Concentrates and Other Biological Products Act 2012
- No. 9/2012 – Finance Act 2012
- No. 10/2012 – Motor Vehicle (Duties And Licences) Act 2012
- No. 11/2012 – Criminal Justice (Female Genital Mutilation) Act 2012
- No. 12/2012 – Social Welfare and Pensions Act 2012
- No. 13/2012 – Protection of Employees (Temporary Agency Work) Act 2012
- No. 14/2012 – Education (Amendment) Act 2012
- No. 15/2012 – Electricity Regulation (Carbon Revenue Levy) (Amendment) Act 2012
- No. 16/2012 – Road Safety Authority (Commercial Vehicle Roadworthiness) Act 2012
- No. 17/2012 – Local Government (Miscellaneous Provisions) Act 2012
- No. 18/2012 – Competition (Amendment) Act 2012
- No. 19/2012 – Statute Law Revision Act 2012
- No. 20/2012 – European Stability Mechanism Act 2012
- No. 21/2012 – European Communities (Amendment) Act 2012
- No. 22/2012 – Companies (Amendment) Act 2012
- No. 23/2012 – Dormant Accounts (Amendment) Act 2012
- No. 24/2012 – Criminal Justice (Withholding of Information on Offences against Children and Vulnerable Persons) Act 2012
- No. 25/2012 – Veterinary Practice (Amendment) Act 2012
- No. 26/2012 – Credit Guarantee Act 2012
- No. 27/2012 – Electoral (Amendment) Act 2012
- No. 28/2012 – Qualifications and Quality Assurance (Education and Training) Act 2012
- No. 29/2012 – Wildlife (Amendment) Act 2012
- No. 30/2012 – European Arrest Warrant (Application to Third Countries and Amendment) and Extradition (Amendment) Act 2012
- No. 31/2012 – Microenterprise Loan Fund Act 2012
- No. 32/2012 – Industrial Relations (Amendment) Act 2012
- No. 33/2012 – Criminal Justice (Search Warrants) Act 2012
- No. 34/2012 – Gaeltacht Act 2012
- No. 35/2012 – Residential Institutions Statutory Fund Act 2012
- No. 36/2012 – Electoral (Amendment) (Political Funding) Act 2012
- No. 37/2012 – Public Service Pensions (Single Scheme and Other Provisions) Act 2012
- No. 38/2012 – Ombudsman (Amendment) Act 2012
- No. 39/2012 – Fiscal Responsibility Act 2012
- No. 40/2012 – Credit Union and Co-Operation With Overseas Regulators Act 2012
- No. 41/2012 – Equal Status (Amendment) Act 2012
- No. 42/2012 – Appropriation Act 2012
- No. 43/2012 – Social Welfare Act 2012
- No. 44/2012 – Personal Insolvency Act 2012
- No. 45/2012 – Health Insurance (Amendment) Act 2012
- No. 46/2012 – Health and Social Care Professionals (Amendment) Act 2012
- No. 47/2012 – National Vetting Bureau (Children and Vulnerable Persons) Act 2012
- No. 48/2012 – Civil Registration (Amendment) Act 2012
- No. 49/2012 – Transport (Córas Iompair Éireann and Subsidiary Companies Borrowings) Act 2012
- No. 50/2012 – Houses of the Oireachtas Commission (Amendment) (No. 2) Act 2012
- No. 51/2012 – Civil Defence Act 2012
- No. 52/2012 – Finance (Local Property Tax) Act 2012
- No. 53/2012 – Europol Act 2012

Constitutional Amendments

- Thirtieth Amendment of the Constitution Act 2012
- Thirty-first Amendment of the Constitution Act 2012

=== 2013 ===
- No. 1/2013 – Euro Area Loan Facility (Amendment) Act 2013
- No. 2/2013 – Irish Bank Resolution Corporation Act 2013
- No. 3/2013 – Houses of the Oireachtas Commission (Amendment) Act 2013
- No. 4/2013 – Finance (Local Property Tax) (Amendment) Act 2013
- No. 5/2013 – Child Care (Amendment) Act 2013
- No. 6/2013 – Water Services Act 2013
- No. 7/2013 – Electoral (Amendment) (Dáil Constituencies) Act 2013
- No. 8/2013 – Finance Act 2013
- No. 9/2013 – Motor Vehicle (Duties and Licences) Act 2013
- No. 10/2013 – Health (Alteration of Criteria for Eligibility) Act 2013
- No. 11/2013 – Education and Training Boards Act 2013
- No. 12/2013 – Defence Forces (Second World War Amnesty and Immunity) Act 2013
- No. 13/2013 – National Lottery Act 2013
- No. 14/2013 – Health (Pricing and Supply of Medical Goods) Act 2013
- No. 15/2013 – Animal Health and Welfare Act 2013
- No. 16/2013 – Non-Use of Motor Vehicles Act 2013
- No. 17/2013 – Public Health (Tobacco) (Amendment) Act 2013
- No. 18/2013 – Financial Emergency Measures in the Public Interest Act 2013
- No. 19/2013 – Criminal Justice Act 2013
- No. 20/2013 – Social Welfare and Pensions (Miscellaneous Provisions) Act 2013
- No. 21/2013 – European Union (Accession of the Republic of Croatia) (Access to the Labour Market) Act 2013
- No. 22/2013 – Housing (Amendment) Act 2013
- No. 23/2013 – Health Service Executive (Governance) Act 2013
- No. 24/2013 – Criminal Law (Human Trafficking) (Amendment) Act 2013
- No. 25/2013 – Further Education and Training Act 2013
- No. 26/2013 – Central Bank (Supervision and Enforcement) Act 2013
- No. 27/2013 – Electoral, Local Government and Planning and Development Act 2013
- No. 28/2013 – Prison Development (Confirmation of Resolutions) Act 2013
- No. 29/2013 – Ministers and Secretaries (Amendment) Act 2013
- No. 30/2013 – Land and Conveyancing Law Reform Act 2013
- No. 31/2013 – Health (Amendment) Act 2013
- No. 32/2013 – Courts and Civil Law (Miscellaneous Provisions) Act 2013
- No. 33/2013 – Houses of the Oireachtas (Inquiries, Privileges and Procedures) Act 2013
- No. 34/2013 – Construction Contracts Act 2013
- No. 35/2013 – Protection of Life During Pregnancy Act 2013
- No. 36/2013 – Industrial Development (Science Foundation Ireland) (Amendment) Act 2013
- No. 37/2013 – Taxi Regulation Act 2013
- No. 38/2013 – Social Welfare and Pensions Act 2013
- No. 39/2013 – Gas Regulation Act 2013
- No. 40/2013 – Child and Family Agency Act 2013
- No. 41/2013 – Finance (No. 2) Act 2013
- No. 42/2013 – Health (Alteration of Criteria for Eligibility) Act 2013
- No. 43/2013 – Appropriation Act 2013
- No. 44/2013 – Adoption (Amendment) Act 2013
- No. 45/2013 – Credit Reporting Act 2013
- No. 46/2013 – Companies (Miscellaneous Provisions) Act 2013
- No. 47/2013 – Public Service Management (Recruitment and Appointments) (Amendment) Act 2013
- No. 48/2013 – Health Insurance (Amendment) Act 2013
- No. 49/2013 – Social Welfare and Pensions (No. 2) Act 2013
- No. 50/2013 – Water Services (No. 2) Act 2013
- No. 51/2013 – Pyrite Resolution Act 2013

Constitutional Amendments

- Thirty-third Amendment of the Constitution Act 2013

=== 2014 ===
- No. 1/2014 – Local Government Reform Act 2014
- No. 2/2014 – European Parliament Elections (Amendment) Act 2014
- No. 3/2014 – Road Traffic Act 2014
- No. 4/2014 – County Enterprise Boards (Dissolution) Act 2014
- No. 5/2014 – ESB (Electronic Communications Networks) Act 2014
- No. 6/2014 – Oireachtas (Ministerial and Parliamentary Offices) (Amendment) Act 2014
- No. 7/2014 – Fines (Payment and Recovery) Act 2014
- No. 8/2014 – Electoral (Amendment) Act 2014
- No. 9/2014 – Central Bank Act 2014
- No. 10/2014 – Johnstown Castle Agricultural College (Amendment) Act 2014
- No. 11/2014 – Criminal Justice (Forensic Evidence and DNA Database System) Act 2014
- No. 12/2014 – Public Health (Sunbeds) Act 2014
- No. 13/2014 – Industrial Development (Forfás Dissolution) Act 2014
- No. 14/2014 – Protected Disclosures Act 2014
- No. 15/2014 – Health Identifiers Act 2014
- No. 16/2014 – Social Welfare and Pensions Act 2014
- No. 17/2014 – Health Service Executive (Financial Matters) Act 2014
- No. 18/2014 – Court of Appeal Act 2014
- No. 19/2014 – Friendly Societies and Industrial and Provident Societies (Miscellaneous Provisions) Act 2014
- No. 20/2014 – Radiological Protection (Miscellaneous Provisions) Act 2014
- No. 21/2014 – Housing (Miscellaneous Provisions) Act 2014
- No. 22/2014 – Strategic Banking Corporation of Ireland Act 2014
- No. 23/2014 – National Treasury Management Agency (Amendment) Act 2014
- No. 24/2014 – Electoral (Amendment) (No. 2) Act 2014
- No. 25/2014 – Irish Human Rights and Equality Commission Act 2014
- No. 26/2014 – Employment Permits (Amendment) Act 2014
- No. 27/2014 – State Airports (Shannon Group) Act 2014
- No. 28/2014 – Health (General Practitioner Service) Act 2014
- No. 29/2014 – Competition and Consumer Protection Act 2014
- No. 30/2014 – Freedom of Information Act 2014
- No. 31/2014 – Forestry Act 2014
- No. 32/2014 – European Stability Mechanism (Amendment) Act 2014
- No. 33/2014 – Health (Miscellaneous Provisions) Act 2014
- No. 34/2014 – Civil Registration (Amendment) Act 2014
- No. 35/2014 – Appropriation Act 2014
- No. 36/2014 – Intellectual Property (Miscellaneous Provisions) Act 2014
- No. 37/2014 – Finance Act 2014
- No. 38/2014 – Companies Act 2014
- No. 39/2014 – Road Traffic (No. 2) Act 2014
- No. 40/2014 – Protection of Children's Health (Tobacco Smoke in Mechanically Propelled Vehicles) Act 2014
- No. 41/2014 – Social Welfare and Pensions (No. 2) Act 2014
- No. 42/2014 – Health Insurance (Amendment) Act 2014
- No. 43/2014 – Merchant Shipping (Registration of Ships) Act 2014
- No. 44/2014 – Water Services Act 2014

=== 2015 ===
- No. 1/2015 – Central Bank (Amendment) Act 2015
- No. 2/2015 – Irish Collective Asset-Management Vehicles Act 2015
- No. 3/2015 – Garda Síochána (Amendment) Act 2015
- No. 4/2015 – Public Health (Standardised Packaging of Tobacco) Act 2015
- No. 5/2015 – Regulation of Lobbying Act 2015
- No. 6/2015 – Misuse of Drugs (Amendment) Act 2015
- No. 7/2015 – Betting (Amendment) Act 2015
- No. 8/2015 – Redress for Women Resident in Certain Institutions Act 2015
- No. 9/2015 – Children and Family Relationships Act 2015
- No. 10/2015 – Valuation (Amendment) Act 2015
- No. 11/2015 – Education (Miscellaneous Provisions) Act 2015
- No. 12/2015 – Social Welfare (Miscellaneous Provisions) Act 2015
- No. 13/2015 – Vehicle Clamping Act 2015
- No. 14/2015 – Roads Act 2015
- No. 15/2015 – Sport Ireland Act 2015
- No. 16/2015 – Workplace Relations Act 2015
- No. 17/2015 – Criminal Justice (Terrorist Offences) (Amendment) Act 2015
- No. 18/2015 – Customs Act 2015
- No. 19/2015 – Health (General Practitioner Service) Act 2015
- No. 20/2015 – Communications Regulation (Postal Services) (Amendment) Act 2015
- No. 21/2015 – Consumer Protection (Regulation of Credit Servicing Firms) Act 2015
- No. 22/2015 – National Minimum Wage (Low Pay Commission) Act 2015
- No. 23/2015 – Statute Law Revision Act 2015
- No. 24/2015 – Defence (Amendment) Act 2015
- No. 25/2015 – Gender Recognition Act 2015
- No. 26/2015 – Petroleum (Exploration and Extraction) Safety Act 2015
- No. 27/2015 – Industrial Relations (Amendment) Act 2015
- No. 28/2015 – Civil Debt (Procedures) Act 2015
- No. 29/2015 – Environment (Miscellaneous Provisions) Act 2015
- No. 30/2015 – Children (Amendment) Act 2015
- No. 31/2015 – Teaching Council (Amendment) Act 2015
- No. 32/2015 – Personal Insolvency (Amendment) Act 2015
- No. 33/2015 – Urban Regeneration and Housing Act 2015
- No. 34/2015 – Houses of the Oireachtas (Appointments to Certain Offices) Act 2015
- No. 35/2015 – Marriage Act 2015
- No. 36/2015 – Children First Act 2015
- No. 37/2015 – Finance (Miscellaneous Provisions) Act 2015
- No. 38/2015 – Choice of Court (Hague Convention) Act 2015
- No. 39/2015 – Financial Emergency Measures in the Public Interest Act 2015
- No. 40/2015 – Criminal Justice (Mutual Assistance) (Amendment) Act 2015
- No. 41/2015 – Motor Vehicle (Duties and Licences) Act 2015
- No. 42/2015 – Residential Tenancies (Amendment) Act 2015
- No. 43/2015 – Equality (Miscellaneous Provisions) Act 2015
- No. 44/2015 – National Cultural Institutions (National Concert Hall) Act 2015
- No. 45/2015 – Child Care (Amendment) Act 2015
- No. 46/2015 – Climate Action and Low Carbon Development Act 2015
- No. 47/2015 – Social Welfare and Pensions Act 2015
- No. 48/2015 – Appropriation Act 2015
- No. 49/2015 – Garda Síochána (Policing Authority and Miscellaneous Provisions) Act 2015
- No. 50/2015 – Finance (Local Property Tax) (Amendment) Act 2015
- No. 51/2015 – Courts Act 2015
- No. 52/2015 – Finance Act 2015
- No. 53/2015 – Houses of the Oireachtas Commission (Amendment) Act 2015
- No. 54/2015 – Health Insurance (Amendment) Act 2015
- No. 55/2015 – Dublin Docklands Development Authority (Dissolution) Act 2015
- No. 56/2015 – Criminal Justice (Burglary of Dwellings) Act 2015
- No. 57/2015 – Prisons Act 2015
- No. 58/2015 – Mental Health (Amendment) Act 2015
- No. 59/2015 – Finance (Tax Appeals) Act 2015
- No. 60/2015 – Bankruptcy (Amendment) Act 2015
- No. 61/2015 – Harbours Act 2015
- No. 62/2015 – Electoral (Amendment) Act 2015
- No. 63/2015 – Planning and Development (Amendment) Act 2015
- No. 64/2015 – Assisted Decision-Making (Capacity) Act 2015
- No. 65/2015 – Legal Services Regulation Act 2015
- No. 66/2015 – International Protection Act 2015

Constitutional Amendments

- Thirty-fourth Amendment of the Constitution Act 2015

=== 2016 ===
- No. 1/2016 – Credit Guarantee (Amendment) Act 2016
- No. 2/2016 – Horse Racing Ireland Act 2016
- No. 3/2016 – Public Transport Act 2016
- No. 4/2016 – Criminal Justice (Spent Convictions and Certain Disclosures) Act 2016
- No. 5/2016 – Electoral (Amendment) Act 2016
- No. 6/2016 – Health (Amendment) Act 2016
- No. 7/2016 – Water Services (Amendment) Act 2016
- No. 8/2016 – Proceeds of Crime (Amendment) Act 2016
- No. 9/2016 – Misuse of Drugs (Amendment) Act 2016
- No. 10/2016 – Commission of investigation (Irish Bank Resolution Corporation) Act 2016
- No. 11/2016 – Paternity Leave and Benefit Act 2016
- No. 12/2016 – Energy Act 2016
- No. 13/2016 – Finance (Certain European Union and Intergovernmental Obligations) Act 2016
- No. 14/2016 – National Tourism Development Authority (Amendment) Act 2016
- No. 15/2016 – Social Welfare Act 2016
- No. 16/2016 – Appropriation Act 2016
- No. 17/2016 – Planning and Development (Housing) and Residential Tenancies Act 2016
- No. 18/2016 – Finance Act 2016
- No. 19/2016 – Health Insurance (Amendment) Act 2016
- No. 20/2016 – Statute Law Revision Act 2016
- No. 21/2016 – Road Traffic Act 2016
- No. 22/2016 – Courts Act 2016

=== 2017 ===
- No. 1/2017 – Health (Miscellaneous Provisions) Act 2017
- No. 2/2017 – Criminal Law (Sexual Offences) Act 2017
- No. 3/2017 – Communications Regulation (Postal Services) (Amendment) Act 2017
- No. 4/2017 – Criminal Justice (Suspended Sentences of Imprisonment) Act 2017
- No. 5/2017 – Health (Amendment) Act 2017
- No. 6/2017 – Knowledge Development Box (Certification of Inventions) Act 2017
- No. 7/2017 – Misuse of Drugs (Supervised Injecting Facilities) Act 2017
- No. 8/2017 – Courts Act 2017
- No. 9/2017 – Companies (Accounting) Act 2017
- No. 10/2017 – Medical Practitioners (Amendment) Act 2017
- No. 11/2017 – Criminal Justice (Offences Relating to Information Systems) Act 2017
- No. 12/2017 – Competition (Amendment) Act 2017
- No. 13/2017 – Companies (Amendment) Act 2017
- No. 14/2017 – Criminal Justice Act 2017
- No. 15/2017 – Petroleum and Other Minerals Development (Prohibition of Onshore Hydraulic Fracturing) Act 2017
- No. 16/2017 – Inland Fisheries (Amendment) Act 2017
- No. 17/2017 – Rugby World Cup 2023 Act 2017
- No. 18/2017 – Ministers and Secretaries (Amendment) Act 2017
- No. 19/2017 – Adoption (Amendment) Act 2017
- No. 20/2017 – Planning and Development (Amendment) Act 2017
- No. 21/2017 – Central Bank and Financial Services Authority of Ireland (Amendment) Act 2017
- No. 22/2017 – Financial Services and Pensions Ombudsman Act 2017
- No. 23/2017 – Minerals Development Act 2017
- No. 24/2017 – Asian Infrastructure Investment Bank Act 2017
- No. 25/2017 – Independent Reporting Commission Act 2017
- No. 26/2017 – National Shared Services Office Act 2017
- No. 27/2017 – Mediation Act 2017
- No. 28/2017 – Criminal Justice (Victims of Crime) Act 2017
- No. 29/2017 – Water Services Act 2017
- No. 30/2017 – Civil Liability (Amendment) Act 2017
- No. 31/2017 – Legal Metrology (Measuring Instruments) Act 2017
- No. 32/2017 – Health and Social Care Professionals (Amendment) Act 2017
- No. 33/2017 – Diplomatic Relations (Miscellaneous Provisions) Act 2017
- No. 34/2017 – Public Service Pay and Pensions Act 2017
- No. 35/2017 – Appropriation Act 2017
- No. 36/2017 – Protection of Cultural Property in the Event of Armed Conflict (Hague Convention) Act 2017
- No. 37/2017 – Health Insurance (Amendment) Act 2017
- No. 38/2017 – Social Welfare Act 2017
- No. 39/2017 – Electoral Amendment (Dáil Constituencies) Act 2017
- No. 40/2017 – Irish Sign Language Act 2017
- No. 41/2017 – Finance Act 2017

=== 2018 ===
- No. 1/2018 – Intoxicating Liquor (Amendment) Act 2018
- No. 2/2018 – Public Service Superannuation (Amendment) Act 2018
- No. 3/2018 – Technological Universities Act 2018
- No. 4/2018 – Telecommunications Services (Ducting and Cables) Act 2018
- No. 5/2018 – Vehicle Registration Data (Automated Searching and Exchange) Act 2018
- No. 6/2018 – Domestic Violence Act 2018
- No. 7/2018 – Data Protection Act 2018
- No. 8/2018 – Radiological Protection (Amendment) Act 2018
- No. 9/2018 – Criminal Justice (Corruption Offences) Act 2018
- No. 10/2018 – Mental Health (Amendment) Act 2018
- No. 11/2018 – Childcare Support Act 2018
- No. 12/2018 – National Archives (Amendment) Act 2018
- No. 13/2018 – Health (General Practitioner Service) Act 2018
- No. 14/2018 – Education (Admission to Schools) Act 2018
- No. 15/2018 – Heritage Act 2018
- No. 16/2018 – Planning and Development (Amendment) Act 2018
- No. 17/2018 – Intoxicating Liquor (Breweries and Distilleries) Act 2018
- No. 18/2018 – Road Traffic (Amendment) Act 2018
- No. 19/2018 – Industrial Development (Amendment) Act 2018
- No. 20/2018 – Children and Family Relationships (Amendment) Act 2018
- No. 21/2018 – Insurance (Amendment) Act 2018
- No. 22/2018 – Companies (Statutory Audits) Act 2018
- No. 23/2018 – Mental Health (Renewal Orders) Act 2018
- No. 24/2018 – Public Health (Alcohol) Act 2018
- No. 25/2018 – Markets in Financial Instruments Act 2018
- No. 26/2018 – Criminal Justice (Money Laundering and Terrorist Financing) (Amendment) Act 2018
- No. 27/2018 – Children's Health Act 2018
- No. 28/2018 – Home Building Finance Ireland Act 2018
- No. 29/2018 – Fossil Fuel Divestment Act 2018
- No. 30/2018 – Finance Act 2018
- No. 31/2018 – Health (Regulation of Termination of Pregnancy) Act 2018
- No. 32/2018 – European Investment Fund Agreement Act 2018
- No. 33/2018 – Appropriation Act 2018
- No. 34/2018 – Irish Film Board (Amendment) Act 2018
- No. 35/2018 – Health Insurance (Amendment) Act 2018
- No. 36/2018 – Consumer Protection (Regulation of Credit Servicing Firms) Act 2018
- No. 37/2018 – Social Welfare, Pensions and Civil Registration Act 2018
- No. 38/2018 – Employment (Miscellaneous Provisions) Act 2018
- No. 39/2018 – Public Service Superannuation (Age of Retirement) Act 2018
- No. 40/2018 – Finance (African Development (Bank and Fund) and Miscellaneous Provisions) Act 2018
- No. 41/2018 – Houses of the Oireachtas Commission (Amendment) Act 2018
- No. 42/2018 – Central Bank (National Claims Information Database) Act 2018

Constitutional Amendments

- Thirty-sixth Amendment of the Constitution Act 2018
- Thirty-seventh Amendment of the Constitution Act 2018

=== 2019 ===
- No. 1/2019 – Local Government Act 2019
- No. 2/2019 – Hallmarking (Amendment) Act 2019
- No. 3/2019 – Personal Injuries Assessment Board (Amendment) Act 2019
- No. 4/2019 – Criminal Law (Sexual Offences) (Amendment) Act 2019
- No. 5/2019 – Data Sharing and Governance Act 2019
- No. 6/2019 – Criminal Law (Extraterritorial Jurisdiction) Act 2019
- No. 7/2019 – European Parliament Elections (Amendment) Act 2019
- No. 8/2019 – Withdrawal of the United Kingdom from the European Union (Consequential Provisions) Act 2019
- No. 9/2019 – Sea-Fisheries (Amendment) Act 2019
- No. 10/2019 – Companies (Amendment) Act 2019
- No. 11/2019 – Parental Leave (Amendment) Act 2019
- No. 12/2019 – Aircraft Noise (Dublin Airport) Regulation Act 2019
- No. 13/2019 – Civil Registration Act 2019
- No. 14/2019 – Residential Tenancies (Amendment) Act 2019
- No. 15/2019 – Greyhound Racing Act 2019
- No. 16/2019 – Health and Social Care Professionals (Amendment) Act 2019
- No. 17/2019 – Health Service Executive (Governance) Act 2019
- No. 18/2019 – National Surplus (Reserve Fund for Exceptional Contingencies) Act 2019
- No. 19/2019 – Copyright and Other Intellectual Property Law Provisions Act 2019
- No. 20/2019 – Criminal Justice (Mutual Recognition of Probation Judgements and Decisions) Act 2019
- No. 21/2019 – Industrial Relations (Amendment) Act 2019
- No. 22/2019 – Land and Conveyancing Law Reform (Amendment) Act 2019
- No. 23/2019 – Civil Law (Presumption of Death) Act 2019
- No. 24/2019 – Local Government Rates and other Matters Act 2019
- No. 25/2019 – Citizens' Assemblies Act 2019
- No. 26/2019 – Redress for Women Resident in Certain Institutions (Amendment) Act 2019
- No. 27/2019 – Criminal Justice (International Co-Operation) Act 2019
- No. 28/2019 – Parole Act 2019
- No. 29/2019 – Coroners (Amendment) Act 2019
- No. 30/2019 – Courts Act 2019
- No. 31/2019 – CervicalCheck Tribunal Act 2019
- No. 32/2019 – Qualifications and Quality Assurance (Education and Training) (Amendment) Act 2019
- No. 33/2019 – Judicial Council Act 2019
- No. 34/2019 – Social Welfare Act 2019
- No. 35/2019 – Parent's Leave and Benefit Act 2019
- No. 36/2019 – Health and Childcare Support (Miscellaneous Provisions) Act 2019
- No. 37/2019 – Family Law Act 2019
- No. 38/2019 – Consumer Protection (Gift Vouchers) Act 2019.
- No. 39/2019 – Finance (Tax Appeals and Prospectus Regulation) Act 2019
- No. 40/2019 – Prohibition of Nuclear Weapons Act 2019
- No. 41/2019 – Appropriation Act 2019
- No. 42/2019 – Landlord and Tenant (Ground Rents) (Amendment) Act 2019
- No. 43/2019 – Blasphemy (Abolition of Offences and Related Matters) Act 2019
- No. 44/2019 – Gaming and Lotteries (Amendment) Act 2019
- No. 45/2019 – Finance Act 2019
- No. 46/2019 – Industrial Development (Amendment) Act 2019
- No. 47/2019 – Housing (Regulation of Approved Housing Bodies) Act 2019
- No. 48/2019 – Social Welfare (No. 2) Act 2019.
- No. 49/2019 – Health Insurance (Amendment) Act 2019.
- No. 50/2019 – Migration of Participating Securities Act 2019.
- No. 51/2019 – Criminal Records (Exchange of Information) Act 2019
- No. 52/2019 – Microbeads (Prohibition) Act 2019
- No. 53/2019 – Consumer Insurance Contracts Act 2019

Constitutional Amendments

- Thirty-eighth Amendment of the Constitution (Dissolution of Marriage) Act 2019

== 2020– ==
=== 2020 ===
- No. 1/2020 – Health (Preservation and Protection and other Emergency Measures in the Public Interest) Act 2020
- No. 2/2020 – Emergency Measures in the Public Interest (COVID-19) Act 2020
- No. 3/2020 – Microenterprise Loan Fund (Amendment) Act 2020
- No. 4/2020 – Financial Provisions (COVID-19) Act 2020
- No. 5/2020 – Credit Guarantee (Amendment) Act 2020
- No. 6/2020 – National Oil Reserves Agency (Amendment) and Provision of Central Treasury Services Act 2020
- No. 7/2020 – Residential Tenancies and Valuation Act 2020
- No. 8/2020 – Financial Provisions (COVID-19) (No. 2) Act 2020
- No. 9/2020 – Companies (Miscellaneous Provisions (COVID-19) Act 2020
- No. 10/2020 – Ministers and Secretaries and Ministerial, Parliamentary, Judicial and Court Offices (Amendment) Act 2020
- No. 11/2020 – Health (General Practitioner Service and Alteration of Criteria for Eligibility) Act 2020
- No. 12/2020 – Social Welfare (COVID-19) (Amendment) Act 2020
- No. 13/2020 – Civil Law and Criminal Law (Miscellaneous Provisions) Act 2020
- No. 14/2020 – Criminal Justice (Enforcement Powers) (COVID-19) Act 2020
- No. 15/2020 – Forestry (Miscellaneous Provisions) Act 2020
- No. 16/2020 – Regulated Professions (Health and Social Care) (Amendment) Act 2020
- No. 17/2020 – Residential Tenancies Act 2020
- No. 18/2020 – Railway Safety (Reporting and Investigation of Serious Accidents, Accidents and Incidents Involving Certain Railways) Act 2020
- No. 19/2020 – Health (Amendment) Act 2020
- No. 20/2020 – Commission of Investigation (Mother and Baby Homes and Certain Related Matters) Records, and Another Matter, Act 2020
- No. 21/2020 – Criminal Justice (Mutual Recognition of Decisions on Supervision Measures) Act 2020
- No. 22/2020 – Credit Union Restructuring Board (Dissolution) Act 2020
- No. 23/2020 – Withdrawal of the United Kingdom from the European Union (Consequential Provisions) Act 2020
- No. 24/2020 – Health Insurance (Amendment) Act 2020
- No. 25/2020 – Finance (Miscellaneous Provisions) Act 2020
- No. 26/2020 – Finance Act 2020
- No. 27/2020 – Planning and Development, and Residential Tenancies, Act 2020
- No. 28/2020 – Central Mental Hospital (Relocation) Act 2020
- No. 29/2020 – Appropriation Act 2020
- No. 30/2020 – Social Welfare Act 2020
- No. 31/2020 – Investment Limited Partnerships (Amendment) Act 2020
- No. 32/2020 – Harassment, Harmful Communications and Related Offences Act 2020

=== 2021 ===
- No. 1/2021 – Health (Amendment) Act 2021
- No. 2/2021 – Criminal Justice (Theft and Fraud Offences) (Amendment) Act 2021
- No. 3/2021 – Criminal Justice (Money Laundering and Terrorist Financing) (Amendment) Act 2021
- No. 4/2021 – Family Leave and Miscellaneous Provisions Act 2021
- No. 5/2021 – Residential Tenancies Act 2021
- No. 6/2021 – Children (Amendment) Act 2021
- No. 7/2021 – Criminal Procedure Act 2021
- No. 8/2021 – Education (Leaving Certificate 2021) (Accredited Grades) Act 2021
- No. 9/2021 – Loan Guarantee Schemes Agreements (Strategic Banking Corporation of Ireland) Act 2021
- No. 10/2021 – Personal Insolvency (Amendment) Act 2021
- No. 11/2021 – Planning and Development, Heritage and Broadcasting (Amendment) Act 2021
- No. 12/2021 – Health and Criminal Justice (COVID-19) (Amendment) Act 2021
- No. 13/2021 – Criminal Justice (Perjury and Related Offences) Act 2021
- No. 14/2021 – Civil Law (Miscellaneous Provisions) Act 2021
- No. 15/2021 – Public Service Pay Act 2021
- No. 16/2021 – Counterfeiting Act 2021
- No. 17/2021 – Residential Tenancies (No. 2) Act 2021
- No. 18/2021 – Planning and Development (Amendment) Act 2021
- No. 19/2021 – Private Security Services (Amendment) Act 2021
- No. 20/2021 – Gender Pay Gap Information Act 2021
- No. 21/2021 – Sale of Tickets (Cultural, Entertainment, Recreational and Sporting Events) Act 2021
- No. 22/2021 – CervicalCheck Tribunal (Amendment) Act 2021
- No. 23/2021 – Finance (COVID-19 and Miscellaneous Provisions) Act 2021
- No. 24/2021 – Health (Amendment) (No. 2) Act 2021
- No. 25/2021 – Affordable Housing Act 2021
- No. 26/2021 – Land Development Agency Act 2021
- No. 27/2021 – Nursing Homes Support Scheme (Amendment) Act 2021
- No. 28/2021 – Maritime Jurisdiction Act 2021
- No. 29/2021 – Workplace Relations (Miscellaneous Provisions) Act 2021
- No. 30/2021 – Companies (Rescue Process For Small and Micro Companies) Act 2021
- No. 31/2021 – Finance (Local Property Tax) (Amendment) Act 2021
- No. 32/2021 – Climate Action and Low Carbon Development (Amendment) Act 2021
- No. 33/2021 – Defence (Amendment) Act 2021
- No. 34/2021 – Child and Family Agency (Amendment) Act 2021
- No. 35/2021 – Land and Conveyancing Law Reform Act 2021
- No. 36/2021 – Criminal Justice (Amendment) Act 2021
- No. 37/2021 – Health (Amendment) (No. 3) Act 2021
- No. 38/2021 – Finance (European Stability Mechanism and Single Resolution Fund) Act 2021
- No. 39/2021 – Residential Tenancies (Amendment) Act 2021
- No. 40/2021 – Planning and Development (Large Scale Residential Developments) Act 2021
- No. 41/2021 – Houses of the Oireachtas Commission (Amendment) Act 2021
- No. 42/2021 – Criminal Justice (Smuggling of Persons) Act 2021
- No. 43/2021 – Appropriation Act 2021
- No. 44/2021 – Social Welfare Act 2021
- No. 45/2021 – Finance Act 2021
- No. 46/2021 – Health and Criminal Justice (Covid-19) (Amendment) (No. 2) Act 2021
- No. 47/2021 – Health Insurance (Amendment) Act 2021
- No. 48/2021 – Companies (Corporate Enforcement Authority) Act 2021
- No. 49/2021 – Official Languages (Amendment) Act 2021
- No. 50/2021 – Maritime Area Planning Act 2021

=== 2022 ===
- No. 1/2022 – Electricity Costs (Domestic Electricity Accounts) Emergency Measures Act 2022
- No. 2/2022 – Sea Fisheries (Miscellaneous Provisions) Act 2022
- No. 3/2022 – Redundancy Payments (Amendment) Act 2022
- No. 4/2022 – Animal Health and Welfare and Forestry (Miscellaneous Provisions) Act 2022
- No. 5/2022 – Consumer Protection (Regulation of Retail Credit and Credit Servicing Firms) Act 2022
- No. 6/2022 – Health (Miscellaneous Provisions) Act 2022
- No. 7/2022 – Garda Síochána (Functions and Operational Areas) Act 2022
- No. 8/2022 – Merchant Shipping (Investigation of Marine Casualties) (Amendment) Act 2022
- No. 9/2022 – Finance (COVID-19 and Miscellaneous Provisions) Act 2022
- No. 10/2022 – Garda Síochána (Amendment) Act 2022
- No. 11/2022 – Insurance (Miscellaneous Provisions) Act 2022
- No. 12/2022 – Competition (Amendment) Act 2022
- No. 13/2022 – Consumer Credit (Amendment) Act 2022
- No. 14/2022 – Birth Information and Tracing Act 2022
- No. 15/2022 – Regulation of Providers of Building Works and Miscellaneous Provisions Act 2022
- No. 16/2022 – Defence Forces (Evidence) Act 2022
- No. 17/2022 – Eirgrid, Electricity and Turf (Amendment) Act 2022
- No. 18/2022 – Institutional Burials Act 2022
- No. 19/2022 – Civil Law (Miscellaneous Provisions) Act 2022
- No. 20/2022 – Health (Miscellaneous Provisions) (No. 2) Act 2022
- No. 21/2022 – Child Care (Amendment) Act 2022
- No. 22/2022 – Education (Provision in Respect of Children with Special Needs) Act 2022
- No. 23/2022 – Payment of Wages (Amendment) (Tips and Gratuities) Act 2022
- No. 24/2022 – Sick Leave Act 2022
- No. 25/2022 – Communications (Retention of Data) (Amendment) Act 2022
- No. 26/2022 – Circular Economy and Miscellaneous Provisions Act 2022
- No. 27/2022 – Protected Disclosures (Amendment) Act 2022
- No. 28/2022 – Remediation of Dwellings Damaged by the use of Defective Concrete Blocks Act 2022
- No. 29/2022 – Planning and Development, Maritime and Valuation (Amendment) Act 2022
- No. 30/2022 – Electoral Reform Act 2022
- No. 31/2022 – Higher Education Authority Act 2022
- No. 32/2022 – Electricity Costs (Domestic Electricity Accounts) Emergency Measures and Miscellaneous Provisions Act 2022
- No. 33/2022 – Garda Síochána (Compensation) Act 2022
- No. 34/2022 – Residential Tenancies (Deferment of Termination Dates of Certain Tenancies) Act 2022
- No. 35/2022 – Development (Emergency Electricity Generation) Act 2022
- No. 36/2022 – Bretton Woods Agreements (Amendment) Act 2022
- No. 37/2022 – Consumer Rights Act 2022
- No. 38/2022 – Credit Guarantee (Amendment) Act 2022
- No. 39/2022 – Water Services (Amendment) Act 2022
- No. 40/2022 – Air Navigation and Transport Act 2022
- No. 41/2022 – Online Safety and Media Regulation Act 2022
- No. 42/2022 – Personal Injuries Resolution Board Act 2022
- No. 43/2022 – Social Welfare Act 2022
- No. 44/2022 – Finance Act 2022
- No. 45/2022 – Appropriation Act 2022
- No. 46/2022 – Assisted Decision-Making (Capacity) (Amendment) Act 2022
- No. 47/2022 – Planning and Development and Foreshore (Amendment) Act 2022
- No. 48/2022 – Water Environment (Abstractions and Associated Impoundments) Act 2022
- No. 49/2022 – Health Insurance (Amendment) Act 2022
- No. 50/2022 – Tailte Éireann Act 2022
- No. 51/2022 – National Tourism Development Authority (Amendment) Act 2022
- No. 52/2022 – Local Government (Maternity Protection and Other Measures for Members of Local Authorities) Act 2022

=== 2023 ===
- No. 1/2023 – National Cultural Institutions (National Concert Hall) (Amendment) Act 2023
- No. 2/2023 – Oil Emergency Contingency and Transfer of Renewable Transport Fuels Functions Act 2023
- No. 3/2023 – Criminal Justice (Mutual Recognition of Custodial Sentences) Act 2023
- No. 4/2023 – Communications Regulation and Digital Hub Development Agency (Amendment) Act 2023
- No. 5/2023 – Central Bank (Individual Accountability Framework) Act 2023
- No. 6/2023 – Environmental Protection Agency (Emergency Electricity Generation) (Amendment) Act 2023
- No. 7/2023 – Health (Amendment) Act 2023
- No. 8/2023 – Work Life Balance and Miscellaneous Provisions Act 2023
- No. 9/2023 – Sex Offenders (Amendment) Act 2023
- No. 10/2023 – Patient Safety (Notifiable Incidents and Open Disclosure) Act 2023
- No. 11/2023 – Finance Act 2023
- No. 12/2023 – Courts Act 2023
- No. 13/2023 – Social Welfare (Child Benefit) Act 2023
- No. 14/2023 – Regulated Professions (Health and Social Care) (Amendment) Act 2023
- No. 15/2023 – Regulation of Lobbying and Oireachtas (Allowances to Members) (Amendment) Act 2023
- No. 16/2023 – Road Traffic and Roads Act 2023
- No. 17/2023 – Civil Defence Act 2023
- No. 18/2023 – Courts and Civil Law (Miscellaneous Provisions) Act 2023
- No. 19/2023 – Agricultural and Food Supply Chain Act 2023
- No. 20/2023 – Mother and Baby Institutions Payment Scheme Act 2023
- No. 21/2023 – Veterinary Medicinal Products, Medicated Feed and Fertilisers Regulation Act 2023
- No. 22/2023 – Representative Actions for the Protection of the Collective Interests of Consumers Act 2023
- No. 23/2023 – Energy (Windfall Gains in the Energy Sector) (Temporary Solidarity Contribution) Act 2023
- No. 24/2023 – Criminal Justice (Miscellaneous Provisions) Act 2023
- No. 25/2023 – Wildlife (Amendment) Act 2023
- No. 26/2023 – Historic and Archaeological Heritage and Miscellaneous Provisions Act 2023
- No. 27/2023 – Control of Exports Act 2023
- No. 28/2023 – Screening of Third Country Transactions Act 2023
- No. 29/2023 – Electricity Costs (Emergency Measures) Domestic Accounts Act 2023
- No. 30/2023 – Energy (Windfall Gains in the Energy Sector) (Cap on Market Revenues) Act 2023
- No. 31/2023 – Domestic, Sexual and Gender-Based Violence Agency Act 2023
- No. 32/2023 – Garda Síochána (Recording Devices) Act 2023
- No. 33/2023 – Judicial Appointments Commission Act 2023
- No. 34/2023 – Credit Union (Amendment) Act 2023
- No. 35/2023 – Public Health (Tobacco Products and Nicotine Inhaling Products) Act 2023
- No. 36/2023 – Health Insurance (Amendment) Act 2023
- No. 37/2023 – Social Welfare (Miscellaneous Provisions) Act 2023
- No. 38/2023 – Appropriation Act 2023
- No. 39/2023 – Finance (No.2) Act 2023
- No. 40/2023 – Electoral (Amendment) Act 2023

=== 2024 ===
- No. 1/2024 – Policing, Security and Community Safety Act 2024
- No. 2/2024 – Digital Services Act 2024
- No. 3/2024 – Finance (State Guarantees, International Financial Institution Funds and Miscellaneous Provisions) Act 2024
- No. 4/2024 – Coroners (Amendment) Act 2024
- No. 5/2024 – Human Tissue (Transplantation, Post-Mortem, Anatomical Examination and Public Display) Act 2024
- No. 6/2024 – Social Welfare and Civil Law (Miscellaneous Provisions) Act 2024
- No. 7/2024 – Local Government (Mayor of Limerick) and Miscellaneous Provisions Act 2024
- No. 8/2024 – Criminal Justice (Engagement of Children in Criminal Activity) Act 2024
- No. 9/2024 – European Arrest Warrant (Amendment) Act 2024
- No. 10/2024 – Road Traffic Act 2024
- No. 11/2024 – Gas (Amendment) and Miscellaneous Provisions Act 2024
- No. 12/2024 – Court Proceedings (Delays) Act 2024
- No. 13/2024 – Health (Termination of Pregnancy Services) (Safe Access Zones) Act 2024
- No. 14/2024 – Employment (Collective Redundancies and Miscellaneous Provisions) and Companies (Amendment) Act 2024
- No. 15/2024 – Research and Innovation Act 2024
- No. 16/2024 – Future Ireland Fund and Infrastructure, Climate and Nature Fund Act 2024
- No. 17/2024 – Employment Permits Act 2024
- No. 18/2024 – Health (Assisted Human Reproduction) Act 2024
- No. 19/2024 – Child Care (Amendment) Act 2024
- No. 20/2024 – Automatic Enrolment Retirement Savings System Act 2024
- No. 21/2024 – Charities (Amendment) Act 2024
- No. 22/2024 – Residential Tenancies (Amendment) Act 2024
- No. 23/2024 – Health (Miscellaneous Provisions) Act 2024
- No. 24/2024 – Social Welfare (Miscellaneous Provisions) Act 2024
- No. 25/2024 – Defence (Amendment) Act 2024
- No. 26/2024 – Digital Services (Levy) Act 2024
- No. 27/2024 – Civil Registration (Electronic Registration) Act 2024
- No. 28/2024 – Criminal Law (Sexual Offences and Human Trafficking) Act 2024
- No. 29/2024 – Health (Miscellaneous Provisions) (No. 2) Act 2024
- No. 30/2024 – Courts, Civil Law, Criminal Law and Superannuation (Miscellaneous Provisions) Act 2024
- No. 31/2024 – Criminal Justice (Amendment) Act 2024
- No. 32/2024 – Motor Insurance Insolvency Compensation Act 2024
- No. 33/2024 – Electricity Costs (Emergency Measures) Domestic Accounts Act 2024
- No. 34/2024 – Planning and Development Act 2024
- No. 35/2024 – Gambling Regulation Act 2024
- No. 36/2024 – Social Welfare Act 2024
- No. 37/2024 – Maternity Protection, Employment Equality and Preservation of Certain Records Act 2024
- No. 38/2024 – Agriculture Appeals (Amendment) Act 2024
- No. 39/2024 – Housing (Miscellaneous Provisions) Act 2024
- No. 40/2024 – Seanad Electoral (University Members) (Amendment) Act 2024
- No. 41/2024 – Criminal Justice (Hate Offences) Act 2024
- No. 42/2024 – Health Insurance (Amendment) and Health (Provision of Menopause Products) Act 2024
- No. 43/2024 – Finance Act 2024
- No. 44/2024 – Companies (Corporate Governance, Enforcement and Regulatory Provisions) Act 2024
- No. 45/2024 – Appropriation Act 2024
- No. 46/2024 – Houses of the Oireachtas Commission (Amendment) Act 2024
- No. 47/2024 – Public Health (Tobacco) (Amendment) Act 2024
- No. 48/2024 – Family Courts Act 2024

=== 2025 ===
- No. 1/2025 – Ministers and Secretaries and Ministerial, Parliamentary, Judicial and Court Offices (Amendment) Act 2025
- No. 2/2025 – Merchant Shipping (Investigation of Marine Accidents) Act 2025
- No. 3/2025 – Financial Services and Pensions Ombudsman (Amendment) Act 2025
- No. 4/2025 – Finance (Provision of Access to Cash Infrastructure) Act 2025
- No. 5/2025 – Residential Tenancies (Amendment) Act 2025
- No. 6/2025 – Finance (Local Property Tax and Other Provisions) (Amendment) Act 2025
- No. 7/2025 – Supports for Survivors of Residential Institutional Abuse Act 2025
- No. 8/2025 – Social Welfare (Bereaved Partner’s Pension and Miscellaneous Provisions) Act 2025
- No. 9/2025 – Planning and Development (Amendment) Act 2025
- No. 10/2025 – Statute Law Revision Act 2025
- No. 11/2025 – Housing Finance Agency (Amendment) Act 2025
- No. 12/2025 – Electricity (Supply) (Amendment) Act 2025
- No. 13/2025 – Courts and Civil law (Miscellaneous Provisions) Act 2025
- No. 14/2025 – Health Insurance (Amendment) Act 2025
- No. 15/2025 – Irish Film Board (Amendment) Act 2025
- No. 16/2025 – Employment (Contractual Retirement Ages) Act 2025
- No. 17/2025 – Appropriation Act 2025
- No. 18/2025 – Finance Act 2025
- No. 19/2025 – Social Welfare and Automatic Enrolment Retirement Savings System (Amendment) Act 2025
- No. 20/2025 – Remediation of Dwellings Damaged by the Use of Defective Concrete Blocks (Amendment) Act 2025
- No. 21/2025 – National Training Fund (Amendment) Act 2025

=== 2026 ===
- No. 1/2026 – Credit Review Act 2026
- No. 2/2026 – Defamation (Amendment) Act 2026
- No. 3/2026 – Residential Tenancies (Miscellaneous Provisions) Act 2026
- No. 4/2026 – Copyright and Related Rights (Amendment) Act 2026
- No. 5/2026 – Environment (Miscellaneous Provisions) Act 2026
- No. 6/2026 – National Oil Reserves Agency (Amendment) Act 2026
- No. 7/2026 – Protection of Employees (Employers' Insolvency) (Amendment) Act 2026
- No. 8/2026 – Assisted Decision-Making (Capacity) (Amendment) Act 2026
- No. 9/2026 – International Protection Act 2026
- No. 10/2026 – Health Information Act 2026
- No. 11/2026 – Mental Health Act 2026
- No. 12/2026 – International Co-Operation (Omagh Bombing Inquiry) Act 2026
- No. 13/2026 – Arbitration (Amendment) Act 2026
- No. 14/2026 – Air Pollution (Amendment) Act 2026
- No. 15/2026 – Microenterprise Loan Fund (Amendment) Act 2026
- No. 16/2026 – Critical Infrastructure Act 2026
- No. 17/2026 – Health (Amendment) (Home Support Providers) Act 2026
- No. 18/2026 – Údarás na Gaeltachta Amendment) Act 2026
- No. 19/2026 – Criminal Justice (Terrorist Offences) (Amendment) Act 2026
- No. 20/2026 – Public Health (Single-Use Vapes) Act 2026
- No. 21/2026 – Criminal Justice (International Cooperation on Electronic Evidence and Other Matters) Act 2026
- No. 22/2026 – National Treasury Management Agency (Miscellaneous Provisions) Act 2026
- No. 23/2026 – Insurance (Disregard of Certain Medical History and Miscellaneous Provisions) Act 2026
- No. 24/2026 – Finance Act 2026
- No. 25/2026 – Dublin Airport (Passenger Capacity) Act 2026
- No. 26/2026 – Garda Síochána (Recording Devices) (Amendment) Act 2026
- No. 27/2026 – Planning and Development (Amendment) Act 2026
- No. 28/2026 – Postal and Telecommunications Services (Amendment) Act 2026
- No. 29/2026 – Domestic Violence Judgments Register Act 2026
- No. 30/2026 – Guardianship of Infants and Child Care (Amendment) Act 2026
- No. 31/2026 – Regulation of Artificial Intelligence Act 2026
- No. 32/2026 – Health (Provision of Contraception Prescribing Service in Retail Pharmacy Business) Act 2026
- No. 33/2026 – Housing and Residential Tenancies (Miscellaneous Provisions) Act 2026
- No. 34/2026 – Criminal Law, Civil Law and Defence (Miscellaneous Provisions) Act 2026
- No. 35/2026 – Israeli Settlements in the Occupied Palestinian Territory (Prohibition of Importation of Goods) Act 2026
- No. 36/2026 – Development (Strategic Gas Reserve) Act 2026

== See also ==
- List of acts of the Parliament of Ireland for pre-1800 legislation
- List of decrees of the First and Second Dáils
- List of legislation in the United Kingdom
- Irish Statute Book
