= List of acts of the Parliament of Victoria from 1963 =

This is a list of acts of the Parliament of Victoria, Australia for the year 1963.

== 1963 ==
Short title, or popular name	Citation	Royal assent
Long title
Eliza's Restaurant Act 1963	No. 6978	10 April 1963
An Act to provide for the Renewal of a certain Restaurant Licence at St. Kilda for the Remainder of the Year One thousand nine hundred and sixty-three.
	No. 6979	23 April 1963
An Act to apply out of the Consolidated Revenue the sum of Thirty-six million six hundred and one thousand and ten pounds to the service of the year One thousand nine hundred and sixty-three and One thousand nine hundred and sixty-four.
Companies Act 1963	No. 6985	30 April 1963
An Act to amend Section Two hundred and twenty-two of and the Second Schedule to the Companies Act 1961. (Note: Companies Act 1961 (No. 6839))
Railways Dismantling Act 1963 (repealed)	No. 6987	7 May 1963
An Act to make Provision with respect to the Dismantling of certain Railways and Sections of Railways, and for other purposes. (Repealed by Transport Act 1983 (No. 9921))
Railways (Brighton-street Richmond Bridge) Act 1963 (repealed)	No. 6991	7 May 1963
An Act to provide for the Removal of a certain Vehicular Bridge over a Railway in the City of Richmond and the Construction in lieu thereof of a Footbridge. (Repealed by Transport Act 1983 (No. 9921))
	No. 6998	21 May 1963
An Act to apply out of the Consolidated Revenue the sum of One million four hundred and twenty-eight thousand two hundred and seventeen pounds to the service of the year One thousand nine hundred and sixty-two and One thousand nine hundred and sixty-three.
Sheep Branding Fluids Act 1963 (repealed)	No. 7001	21 May 1963
An Act relating to the fluids to be used for the Branding of Sheep. (Repealed by Animal Preparations Act 1987 (No. 12 of 1987))
Metropolitan Transportation Committee Act 1963	No. 7003	21 May 1963
An Act to establish The Metropolitan Transportation Committee and for Purposes connected therewith.
Victoria Amateur Turf Club (Incorporating the Melbourne Racing Club) Act 1963	No. 7015	28 May 1963
An Act to constitute a Body Corporate by the name of Victoria Amateur Turf Club (incorporating the Melbourne Racing Club) the Members of which shall be the Members of a certain Voluntary Association known as Victoria Amateur Turf Club and the Members of the Melbourne Racing Club a Body Corporate constituted by Melbourne Racing Club Act 1956 (Note: Melbourne Racing Club Act 1956 (No. 6000)) and to vest in the said Body Corporate certain Real and Personal Property now held on behalf of the Victoria Amateur Turf Club by the Committee thereof or by Trustees therefor and certain other Real and Personal Property now vested in the Melbourne Racing Club and to provide for the Management of the said Body Corporate and for other purposes.
	No. 7016	28 May 1963
An Act relating to certain Land at North Melbourne.
Westernport (Oil Refinery) Act 1963	No. 7018	28 May 1963
An Act to ratify validate approve and otherwise give Effect to an Agreement between the Premier for and on behalf of the State of Victoria and BP Refinery (Westernport) Proprietary Limited with respect to the Establishment at Crib Point in the State of Victoria of a Refinery to authorize the Construction of Port Facilities at Crib Point to authorize and make Provision with respect to the Construction of certain Pipelines from Crib Point and for other purposes.
	No. 7025	26 September 1963
An Act to apply out of the Consolidated Revenue the sum of Forty-one million seven hundred and seven thousand eight hundred and seventy pounds to the service of the year One thousand nine hundred and sixty-three and One thousand nine hundred and sixty-four.
Adoption of Children (Guardians) Act 1963	No. 7026	26 September 1963
An Act to amend Sub-section (4) of Section Eleven of the Adoption of Children Act 1958. (Note: Adoption of Children Act 1958 (No. 6192))
Trustee Companies (The Perpetual Executors and Trustees Association of Australia Limited) Act 1963	No. 7037	6 November 1963
An Act to amend the Second Schedule of the Trustee Companies Act 1958. (Note: Trustee Companies Act 1958 (No. 6402))
Colac to Weeaproinah Railways Dismantling Act 1963 (repealed)	No. 7049	19 November 1963
An Act to provide for the Dismantling of a certain Railway and Section of a Railway, and for other purposes. (Repealed by Transport Act 1983 (No. 9921))
Shell Company of Australia Limited Act 1963 (Note: The corresponding act in the United Kingdom was the Shell Company of Australia Act 1964 (c. xix (UK)))	No. 7053	26 November 1963
An Act to authorize The Shell Company of Australia Limited to become a Company deemed to be incorporated in Victoria, to preserve the Identity of the Company so incorporated with The Shell Company of Australia Limited an Existing Company within the Meaning of the Companies Act 1948 (Note: Companies Act 1948 (11 & 12 Geo. 6. c. 38 (UK))) of the United Kingdom, and for other purposes.
Water Supply Loan Application Act 1963 (repealed)	No. 7056	26 November 1963
An Act to sanction the Issue and Application of Loan Money for Works and other Purposes relating to Irrigation Water Supply Drainage Sewerage Flood Protection and River Improvement, and for other purposes. (Repealed by Treasury Legislation (Repeal) Act 2005 (No. 73 of 2005))
Standard Insurance Company Limited (Amendment) Act 1963	No. 7059	26 November 1963
An Act to amend the Standard Insurance Company Limited Act 1962. (Note: Standard Insurance Company Limited Act 1962 (No. 6862))
Dandenong Valley Authority Act 1963 (repealed)	No. 7060	26 November 1963
An Act to constitute a Dandenong Valley Authority for the better Drainage of the Waters of the Dandenong Creek and its Tributaries Channels and Watercourses, the Improvement of Lands within the Catchment thereof and for the Prevention of Flooding and Pollution, and for other purposes. (Repealed by Water Act 1989 (No. 80 of 1989))
Statute Law Revision Act 1963	No. 7065	3 December 1963
An Act to revise the Statute Law.
Australian and Overseas Insurance Company Limited Act 1963	No. 7067	3 December 1963
An Act to make Provision with respect to Claims against and Liabilities incurred by the Australian and Overseas Insurance Company Limited in relation to certain Policies of Accident Insurance or Indemnity against Awards of Compensation under the Workers Compensation Act 1958 (Note: Workers Compensation Act 1958 (No. 6419)) and for other purposes.
University (Amendment) Act 1963	No. 7068	3 December 1963
An Act to amend the University Act 1958. (Note: University Act 1958 (No. 6405))
State Savings Bank (Amendment) Act 1963	No. 7069	3 December 1963
An Act to amend the State Savings Bank Act 1958. (Note: State Savings Bank Act 1958 (No. 6379))
Motor Car Act 1963	No. 7073	10 December 1963
An Act to amend the Motor Car Act 1958, (Note: Motor Car Act 1958 (No. 6325)) and for other purposes.
Agricultural Education (Cadetships) Act 1963	No. 7074	10 December 1963
An Act to amend the Agricultural Education Act 1958 (Note: Agricultural Education Act 1958 (No. 6195)) with respect to the Provision of Cadetships for certain Students.
Apprenticeship (Amendment) Act 1963	No. 7079	10 December 1963
An Act to amend the Apprenticeship Act 1958. (Note: Apprenticeship Act 1958 (No. 6199))
Underseas Mineral Resources Act 1963	No. 7095	10 December 1963
An Act to make Provision with respect to the Exploration and Exploitation of the Mineral Resources of the Sea Bed and the Subsoil in certain Waters within and beyond the Territorial Limits of Victoria, and for other purposes.
City of Melbourne Underground Railway Construction Act 1963	No. 7100	10 December 1963
An Act to revoke a certain Proclamation made under the City of Melbourne Underground Railway Construction Act 1960 (Note: City of Melbourne Underground Railway Construction Act 1960 (No. 6652)) and for other purposes
Cultural and Recreational Lands Act 1963	No. 7101	10 December 1963
An Act to amend the Law in relation to the Acquisition and Rating of Certain Lands used for Cultural Recreational Sporting and similar purposes.
	No. 7102	10 December 1963
An Act to apply out of the Consolidated Revenue the sum of One million six hundred and ten thousand seven hundred and five pounds to the service of the year One thousand nine hundred and sixty-two and One thousand nine hundred and sixty-three.
	No. 7104	12 December 1963
An Act to apply a sum out of the Consolidated Revenue to the service of the year ending on the thirtieth day of June One thousand nine hundred and sixty-four and to appropriate the Supplies granted in this and the last preceding Session of Parliament.
Boilers Inspection (Amendment) Act 1963	No.	
Bungaree and Warrenheip Lands Exchange Act 1963	No.	
Children's Welfare (Retainers) Act 1963	No.	
Co-operation (Amendment) Act 1963	No.	
Co-operation (Deputy Registrar) Act 1963	No.	
Co-operative Housing Societies (Amendment) Act 1963	No.	
Co-operative Housing Societies (Guarantees) Act 1963	No.	
Coal Mines (Amendment) Act 1963	No.	
Commercial Goods Vehicles (Decentralized Industries) Act 1963	No.	
Companies (Public Borrowings) Act 1963	No.	
Companies (Trustees for Debenture Holders) Act 1963	No.	
Crimes (Aircraft) Act 1963	No.	
Door to Door (Sales) Act 1963	No.	
Drainage Areas (Rates) Act 1963	No.	
Electrical Undertakings Act 1963	No.	
Estate Agents (Amendment) Act 1963	No.	
Estate Agents (Further Amendment) Act 1963	No.	
Evidence (Affidavits) Act 1963	No.	
Fertilizers (Amendment) Act 1963	No.	
Foreign Judgments (Amendment) Act 1963	No.	
Fraudulent Debtors Commitment Act 1963	No.	
Friendly Societies (Building Societies) Act 1963	No.	
Fruit and Vegetable Marketing Advisory Committee Act 1963	No.	
Gas Regulation (Amendment) Act 1963	No.	
Geelong (Market Site) Land Act 1963	No.	
Geelong Waterworks and Sewerage (Amendment) Act 1963	No.	
Goods (Title on Execution) Act 1963	No.	
Grain Elevators (Border Wheat) Act 1963	No.	
Grain Elevators (Borrowing Powers) Act 1963	No.	
Grain Elevators (Bulk Barley) Act 1963	No.	
Hawkers and Pedlers (Amendment) Act 1963	No.	
Health (Amendment) Act 1963	No.	
Home Finance (Amendment) Act 1963	No.	
Hospitals and Charities (Amendment) Act 1963	No.	
Housing (Contracts With Minors) Act 1963	No.	
Housing (Municipal Donations) Act 1963	No.	
Inflammable Liquids Act 1963	No.	
Insurance Commissioner (Costs and Expenses) Act 1963	No.	
Judges' Pensions Act 1963	No.	
Judges' Salaries and Allowances Act 1963	No.	
Justices (Adjourned Proceedings) Act 1963	No.	
Justices (Jurisdiction) Act 1963	No.	
Justices (Service of Summonses by Post) Act 1963	No.	
Labour and Industry (Amendment) Act 1963	No.	
Labour and Industry (Employment of Children) Act 1963	No.	
Land (Amendment) Act 1963	No.	
Land (Surrender by Trustees) Act 1963	No.	
Land Tax (Rates and Appeals) Act 1963	No.	
Landlord and Tenant (Execution of Warrants) Act 1963	No.	
Legal Aid (Amendment) Act 1963	No.	
Local Government (Amendment) Act 1963	No.	
Local Government (Decentralized Industries) Act 1963	No.	
Local Government (Protection from Fire) Act 1963	No.	
Local Government (Shire of Fern Tree Gully) Act 1963	No.	
Local Government Act 1963	No.	
Marine (Amendment) Act 1963	No.	
Marketing of Primary Products (Tobacco Leaf) Act 1963	No.	
Melbourne Harbor Trust (Amendment) Act 1963	No.	
Mildura Irrigation and Water Trusts Act 1963	No.	
Milk Board (Amendment) Act 1963	No.	
Motor Car (Roadworthiness) Act 1963	No.	
Parole Board Membership Act 1963	No.	
Police Offences (Amendment) Act 1963	No.	
Police Offences (Further Amendment) Act 1963	No.	
Portland Harbor Trust (Grain Terminal) Act 1963	No.	
Public Officers Salaries and Allowances Act 1963	No.	
Public Works Loan Application Act 1963	No.	
Racing (Totalizators Percentages) Act 1963	No.	
Racing (Totalizators) Act 1963	No.	
Racing (Trotting Control) Act 1963	No.	
Railway Loan Application Act 1963	No.	
Railways (Financial Reports) Act 1963	No.	
Raising of School Leaving Age (Consequential Amendments) Act 1963	No.	
Revocation and Excision of Crown Reservations Act 1963	No.	
River Murray Waters (Menindee Lakes Storage) Act 1963	No.	
River Murray Waters Act 1963	No.	
Rural Finance and Settlement Commission Act 1963	No.	
Sale of Land (Amendment) Act 1963	No.	
Sewerage Districts Act 1963	No.	
Solicitor-General (Pensions) Act 1963	No.	
Stamps (Amendment) Act 1963	No.	
State Electricity Commission (Licensing of Electrical Mechanics) Act 1963	No.	
State Forests Loan Application Act 1963	No.	
State Insurance Funds Act 1963	No.	
Stock Medicines (Amendment) Act 1963	No.	
Superannuation Act 1963	No.	
Supreme Court (Vexatious Litigants) Act 1963	No.	
Tourist (Amendment) Act 1963	No.	
Transport Regulation (Amendment) Act 1963	No.	
Valuation of Land (Rates) Act 1963	No.	
Vegetation and Vine Diseases (Amendment) Act 1963	No.	
Vermin and Noxious Weeds (Financial) Act 1963	No.	
Water Act 1963	No.	
Wheat Industry Stabilization Act 1963	No.	
Wholesale Fruit and Vegetable Market (Traders) Act 1963	No.	
Williamstown (Melbourne Harbor Trust) Land Act 1963	No.	

== Sources ==
- "1963 Victorian Historical Acts". AustLII.
