= List of acts of the Parliament of Victoria from 1970 =

This is a list of acts of the Parliament of Victoria, Australia for the year 1970.

== 1970 ==
Short title, or popular name	Citation	Royal assent
Long title
Melbourne (Veterinary School) Lands Act 1970 (repealed)	No. 7937	24 March 1970
An Act relating to certain Land in the City of Melbourne permanently reserved as a Site for the Purposes of a School of Veterinary Science in the University of Melbourne. (Repealed by University of Melbourne Land Act 2000 (No. 101 of 2000))
La Trobe University (Amendment) Act 1970	No. 7942	24 March 1970
An Act to amend the La Trobe University Act 1964, (Note: La Trobe University Act 1964 (No. 7189)) and for other purposes.
Acts Interpretation (Nationality) Act 1970	No. 7944	2 April 1970
An Act to amend the Acts Interpretation Act 1958 (Note: Acts Interpretation Act 1958 (No. 6189)) and for other purposes.
Aboriginal Affairs (Amendment) Act 1970	No. 7947	7 April 1970
An Act to amend the Aboriginal Affairs Act 1967. (Note: Aboriginal Affairs Act 1967 (No. 7574))
Wombat Bonuses Act 1970	No. 7956	7 April 1970
An Act to amend the Vermin and Noxious Weeds Act 1958 (Note: Vermin and Noxious Weeds Act 1958 (No. 6409)) with respect to Payment of Bonuses for Destruction of Wombats.
Australia and New Zealand Banking Group Act 1970	No. 7959	7 April 1970
An Act to supplement by Legislation of the State of Victoria the Australia and New Zealand Banking Group Act 1970 (Note: Australia and New Zealand Banking Group Act 1970 (c. v (UK))) of the United Kingdom relating to the Transfer to Australia and New Zealand Banking Group Limited of the Undertakings of Australia and New Zealand Bank Limited and The English, Scottish and Australian Bank, Limited and for other purposes incidental thereto and consequential thereon and to authorize Australia and New Zealand Savings Bank Limited to become a Company deemed to be incorporated in Victoria and to preserve the Identity of the Company so incorporated with Australia and New Zealand Savings Bank Limited an Existing Company within the meaning of the Companies Acts 1948 to 1967 of the United Kingdom and to provide for the Transfer to Australia and New Zealand Savings Bank Limited of the Undertaking of E. S. & A. Savings Bank Limited and for other purposes incidental thereto.
Marketable Securities Act 1970	No. 7970	13 April 1970
An Act to make Provision with respect to Instruments of Transfer of certain Marketable Securities and for other purposes.
Consolidated Revenue (Supply—July to September, 1970) Act 1970	No. 7979	23 June 1970
An Act to apply out of the Consolidated Revenue the sum of One hundred and thirty-nine million five hundred and eleven thousand dollars to the service of the year One thousand nine hundred and seventy and One thousand nine hundred and seventy-one.
Consolidated Revenue (Supplementary Estimates 1969-70) Act 1970	No. 7980	23 June 1970
An Act to apply out of the Consolidated Revenue the sum of Twelve million nine hundred and eighty-two thousand six hundred and seventy-two dollars to the service of the year One thousand nine hundred and sixty-nine and One thousand nine hundred and seventy.
Consolidated Revenue (Supply—October to December, 1970) Act 1970	No. 7981	1 October 1970
An Act to apply out of the Consolidated Revenue the sum of One hundred and fifty-two million six hundred and thirty-one thousand four hundred dollars to the service of the year One thousand nine hundred and seventy and One thousand nine hundred and seventy-one.
West Gate Bridge Royal Commission Act 1970	No. 7989	21 October 1970
An Act with respect to the Appointment of a Royal Commission to Investigate the Failure on the Fifteenth day of October, 1970, of Portion of the West Gate Bridge and for other purposes.
Victorian Inland Meat Authority (Amendment) Act 1970 (repealed)	No. 8000	4 November 1970
An Act to amend the Victorian Inland Meat Authority Act 1958 (Note: Victorian Inland Meat Authority Act 1958 (No. 6411)) in relation to Constitution of the Authority and for other purposes. (Repealed by Victorian Inland Meat Authority Act 1974 (No. 8572)
Audit (Auditor-General) Act 1970	No. 8001	4 November 1970
An Act to amend Section 4 of the Audit Act 1958 (Note: Audit Act 1958 (No. 6203)) and for Purposes connected therewith.
Boilers and Pressure Vessels Act 1970	No. 8004	17 November 1970
An Act to consolidate and amend the Law with respect to matters relating to Boilers and Pressure Vessels, and for other purposes.
Land Conservation Act 1970	No. 8008	24 November 1970
An Act to make Better Provision in relation to the Conservation of Public Land and for other purposes.
River Entrance Docks Railway Construction Act 1970	No. 8009	24 November 1970
An Act to authorize the Construction of a Line of Railway to connect the Railway from Melbourne to Port Melbourne with the Docks at the Mouth of the Yarra River and for other purposes.
Apprenticeship (Amendment) Act 1970	No. 8021	1 December 1970
An Act to amend the Apprenticeship Act 1958. (Note: Apprenticeship Act 1958 (No. 6199))
Melbourne Underground Rail Loop Act 1970 (repealed)	No. 8023	1 December 1970
An Act to Constitute an Authority to Co-ordinate the Financing and Construction of an Underground Rail Loop and Ancillary Works for the Purpose of increasing the Capacity and Efficiency of the existing Melbourne Suburban Rail Network to authorize the Construction of that Underground Rail Loop and those Ancillary Works and for other purposes. (Repealed by Transport Act 1983 (No. 9921))
Commonwealth Places (Administration of Laws) Act 1970	No. 8026	1 December 1970
An Act relating to the Administration of Laws of the Commonwealth and of the State of Victoria in Commonwealth Places and for other purposes.
Water Supply Works and Services Act 1970 (repealed)	No. 8031	8 December 1970
An Act to authorize Expenditure on Works and Services and other Purposes relating to Irrigation Water Supply Drainage Sewerage Flood Protection and River Improvement, and other purposes. (Repealed by Treasury Legislation (Repeal) Act 2005 (No. 73 of 2005))
Railways Lands Act 1970 (repealed)	No. 8040	8 December 1970
An Act to provide for the Dismantling of certain Railways, and for other purposes. (Repealed by Transport Act 1983 (No. 9921))
Employers and Employés (Attachment of Wages) Act 1970 or the Employers and Employees (Attachment of Wages) Act 1970	No. 8043	8 December 1970
An Act to amend Section 61 of the Employers and Employés Act 1958. (Note: Employers and Employés Act 1958 (No. 6242))
Aboriginal Lands Act 1970	No. 8044	8 December 1970
An Act to provide for the Lands reserved for the Use of the Aborigines at Framlingham and Lake Tyers to be vested in a Framlingham Aboriginal Trust and a Lake Tyers Aboriginal Trust respectively, to regulate the Affairs of the said Trusts, to amend the Aboriginal Affairs Act 1967 and the Land Tax Act 1958, (Note: Land Tax Act 1958 (No. 6289)) and for other purposes.
Urban Renewal Act 1970	No. 8052	22 December 1970
An Act to make Provision for the Replanning Redevelopment and Restoration of Certain Areas and to amend the Housing Act 1958 (Note: Housing Act 1958 (No. 6275)) the Local Government Act 1958 (Note: Local Government Act 1958 (No. 6299)) and the Town and Country Planning Act 1961. (Note: Town and Country Planning Act 1961 (No. 6849))
Environment Protection Act 1970	No. 8056	22 December 1970
An Act to establish an Environment Protection Authority, to make Provision with respect to the Powers, Duties, and Functions of that Authority, to make further Provision for the Protection of the Environment and for other Purposes.
Gas Franchises Act 1970	No. 8057	22 December 1970
An Act with respect to the Rights of the Gas and Fuel Corporation of Victoria and the Colonial Gas Association Limited to supply Gas in certain Areas and for other purposes.
Medical Practitioners Act 1970 (repealed)	No. 8061	22 December 1970
An Act to re-enact with Amendments the Law relating to the Registration of Medical Practitioners and for Purposes connected therewith. (Repealed by Medical Practice Act 1994 (No. 23 of 1994))
Teacher Housing Act 1970	No. 8062	22 December 1970
An Act to make Provision for adequate and suitable Housing Accommodation for Teachers, to provide for the Establishment of a Teacher Housing Authority, and for other purposes.
Aerial Spraying Control (Amendment) Act 1970	No. 8069	22 December 1970
An Act to amend the Aerial Spraying Control Act 1966. (Note: Aerial Spraying Control Act 1966 (No. 7403))
Science Museum of Victoria Act 1970	No. 8070	22 December 1970
An Act to constitute a Council of the Science Museum of Victoria and for other purposes.
National Museum of Victoria Council Act 1970	No. 8072	22 December 1970
An Act to constitute the National Museum of Victoria Council and to transfer thereto the Powers Functions and Duties of the Trustees of the National Museum of Victoria.
Summary Offences Act 1970	No. 8075	22 December 1970
An Act to amend Part I. of the Summary Offences Act 1966. (Note: Summary Offences Act 1966 (No. 7405))
Architects (Amendment) Act 1970	No. 8077	22 December 1970
An Act to amend the Architects Act 1958. (Note: Architects Act 1958 (No. 6201))
Dog Act 1970 (repealed)	No. 8079	22 December 1970
An Act to consolidate and amend the Law relating to Dogs. (Repealed by Domestic (Feral and Nuisance) Animals Act 1994 (No. 81 of 1994)))
State Development Act 1970 (repealed)	No. 8081	22 December 1970
An Act to establish a Department of State Development to promote and co-ordinate Activities leading to the full and proper Development of the State and for other purposes. (Repealed by State Development Decentralization and Tourism Act 1978 (No. 9126))
National Parks Act 1970	No. 8083	22 December 1970
An Act to re-enact and amend the Law relating to National Parks and for other purposes.
Consolidated Revenue (Final Supplementary Estimates 1969-70) Act 1970	No. 8087	22 December 1970
An Act to apply out of the Consolidated Revenue the sum of Four million five hundred and eighty-six thousand one hundred and twenty dollars to the service of the year One thousand nine hundred and sixty-nine and One thousand nine hundred and seventy.
Appropriation Act 1970	No. 8088	22 December 1970
An Act to apply a sum out of the Consolidated Fund to the service of the year ending on the thirtieth day of June One thousand nine hundred and seventy-one and to appropriate the Supplies granted in this Session of Parliament.
Social Welfare Act 1970 or the Community Welfare Services Act 1970 or the Community Services Act 1970	No. 8089	22 December 1970
An Act to establish a Social Welfare Department, to make Provision with respect to the Functions of that Department, to re-enact with Amendments certain Provisions of the Children's Welfare Act 1958, (Note: Children's Welfare Act 1958 (No. 6219)) the Gaols Act 1958, (Note: Gaols Act 1958 (No. 6259)) the Street Trading Act 1958, (Note: Street Trading Act 1958 (No. 6385)) the Youth Organizations Assistance Act 1958, (Note: Youth Organizations Assistance Act 1958 (No. 6421)) and the Social Welfare Act 1960 (Note: Social Welfare Act 1960 (No. 6651)) and for other purposes.
Ballarat (Sovereign Hill) Land Act 1970	No.	
Board of Inquiry (Corrupt Practices) Act 1970	No.	
Business Names (Amendment) Act 1970	No.	
Cabrini Private Hospital (Guarantees) Act 1970	No.	
Carriers and Innkeepers (Amendment) Act 1970	No.	
Cemeteries (Coburg Public Cemetery) Act 1970	No.	
Civil Aviation (Carriers' Liability) Act 1970	No.	
Co-operative Housing Societies (Amendment) Act 1970	No.	
Coal Mines (Pensions Increase) Act 1970	No.	
Consumer Protection Act 1970	No.	
Coroners (Amendment) Act 1970	No.	
Country Fire Authority (Borrowing Powers) Act 1970	No.	
Crimes (Amendment) Act 1970	No.	
Criminal Appeals Act 1970	No.	
Dairy Products (Board Membership) Act 1970	No.	
Discharged Servicemen's Preference (Amendment) Act 1970	No.	
Door to Door (Sales) (Amendment) Act 1970	No.	
East Melbourne Land Act 1970	No.	
Evidence (Boards and Commissions) Act 1970	No.	
Evidence (Scientific Tests) Act 1970	No.	
Extractive Industries (Licences) Act 1970	No.	
Fertilizers and Stock Foods (Labelling) Act 1970	No.	
Footwear Regulation Act 1970	No.	
Forests (Amendment) Act 1970	No.	
Gas and Fuel Corporation (Borrowing) Act 1970	No.	
Gas and Fuel Corporation (The Gas Supply Company Limited) Act 1970	No.	
Groundwater (Amendment) Act 1970	No.	
Hairdressers Registration (Amendment) Act 1970	No.	
Hire Purchase (Insurance) Act 1970	No.	
Home Finance (Amendment) Act 1970	No.	
Hospitals Superannuation (Amendment) Act 1970	No.	
Housing (Amendment) Act 1970	No.	
Instruments (Amendment) Act 1970	No.	
Joint Select Committee (Meat Industry) Act 1970	No.	
Joint Select Committee (Road Safety) Act 1970	No.	
Judges Pensions Act 1970	No.	
Judges' Pensions (Amendment) Act 1970	No.	
Judges' Salaries and Allowances Act 1970	No.	
Juries (Compensation) Act 1970	No.	
Justices (Alternative Procedure) Act 1970	No.	
Justices (Bail and Appeals) Act 1970	No.	
Labour and Industry (Amendment) Act 1970	No.	
Labour and Industry (Shop Closing) Act 1970	No.	
Land (Amendment) Act 1970	No.	
Land Settlement (Financial) Act 1970	No.	
Land Tax Act 1970	No.	
Legal Profession Practice (Amendment) Act 1970	No.	
Lifts and Cranes (Amendment) Act 1970	No.	
Local Authorities Superannuation (Disability Benefits) Act 1970	No.	
Local Government (Amendment) Act 1970	No.	
Lotteries Gaming and Betting (Amendment) Act 1970	No.	
Maintenance (Amendment) Act 1970	No.	
Marketable Securities (Amendment) Act 1970	No.	
Melbourne and Metropolitan Board of Works Act 1970	No.	
Melbourne Harbor Trust (Amendment) Act 1970	No.	
Melbourne Lands Exchange Act 1970	No.	
Methodist Church (Victoria) Property Trust Act 1970	No.	
Metropolitan Fire Brigades (Amendment) Act 1970	No.	
Mildura College Lands (Amendment) Act 1970	No.	
Mildura Irrigation and Water Trusts (Amendment) Act 1970	No.	
Mines (Compensation) Act 1970	No.	
Money Lenders (Prescribed Interest) Act 1970	No.	
Motor Car (Amendment) Act 1970	No.	
Motor Car (Falsification of Mileage) Act 1970	No.	
Motor Car (Fees) Act 1970	No.	
Motor Car (Safety) Act 1970	No.	
Parliamentary Salaries Act 1970	No.	
Probate Duty Act 1970	No.	
Public Account Act 1970	No.	
Public Officers Salaries and Allowances Act 1970	No.	
Public Service (Amendment) Act 1970	No.	
Public Works and Services Act 1970	No.	
Racing (Amendment) Act 1970	No.	
Railway Works and Services Act 1970	No.	
Registration of Births Deaths and Marriages (Amendment) Act 1970	No.	
Revocation and Excision of Crown Reservations Act 1970	No.	
Richmond and Hawthorn Lands Act 1970	No.	
River Improvement (Amendment) Act 1970	No.	
River Murray Waters (Dartmouth Reservoir) Act 1970	No.	
River Murray Waters Act 1970	No.	
Road Traffic (Amendment) Act 1970	No.	
Road Traffic (Road Safety and Traffic Authority) Act 1970	No.	
Second-hand Dealers (Charity Collectors) Act 1970	No.	
Securities Industry (Amendment) Act 1970	No.	
Securities Industry Act 1970	No.	
Sewerage Districts (Amendment) Act 1970	No.	
Soldier Settlement Act 1970	No.	
Solicitor-General (Pensions) Act 1970	No.	
Stamps (Receipt Duty Abolition) Act 1970	No.	
Stamps (Salary or Wages) Act 1970	No.	
Stamps Act 1970	No.	
State Forests Works and Services Act 1970	No.	
Statutory Salaries Act 1970	No.	
Stock Diseases (Amendment) Act 1970	No.	
Summary Offences (Trespass to Farms) Act 1970	No.	
Summary Offences (Trespassers) Act 1970	No.	
Superannuation (Amendment) Act 1970	No.	
Teaching Service (Tribunal) Act 1970	No.	
Constitution Act Amendment (Responsible Ministers) Act 1970	No.	
Constitution Act Amendment Act 1970	No.	
Tomato Processing Industry (Amendment) Act 1970	No.	
Town and Country Planning (Appeals Tribunal) Act 1970	No.	
Town and Country Planning (Responsible Authority) Act 1970	No.	
Trustee Companies (Perpetual Trustees Australia Limited) Act 1970	No.	
Vermin and Noxious Weeds (Amendment) Act 1970	No.	
Victoria Institute of Colleges (Affiliated Colleges) Act 1970	No.	
Water (Amendment) Act 1970	No.	
Water (Further Amendment) Act 1970	No.	
Weights and Measures (Amendment) Act 1970	No.	
West Melbourne Market Land (Amendment) Act 1970	No.	
Western Port (Steel Works) Act 1970	No.	
Western Port Steel Works (Development Control) Act 1970	No.	
Westernport Development Act 1970	No.	
Wheat Marketing (Amendment) Act 1970	No.	
Wheat Marketing (Special Quotas) Act 1970	No.	
Wodonga Lands Exchange Act 1970	No.	
Workers Compensation Act 1970	No.	

== Sources ==
- "1970 Victorian Historical Acts". AustLII.
