= List of acts of the Parliament of Victoria from 1965 =

This is a list of acts of the Parliament of Victoria, Australia for the year 1965.

== 1965 ==
Short title, or popular name	Citation	Royal assent
Long title
Appeal Costs Fund (Amendment) Act 1965	No. 7242	5 May 1965
An Act to amend the Appeal Costs Fund Act 1964. (Note: Appeal Costs Fund Act 1964 (No. 7117))
Altona Railway Extension Act 1965 (repealed)	No. 7243	5 May 1965
An Act to authorize the Construction of an Extension to the Altona Railway, and for other purposes. (Repealed by Transport Act 1983 (No. 9921))
Agricultural Education (Continuation) Act 1965	No. 7256	11 May 1965
An Act relating to Agricultural Education.
Victorian Inland Meat Authority (Amendment) Act 1965 (repealed)	No. 7259	11 May 1965
An Act to amend Section Seventeen of the Victorian Inland Meat Authority Act 1958. (Note: Victorian Inland Meat Authority Act 1958 (No. 6411)) (Repealed by Victorian Inland Meat Authority Act 1974 (No. 8572)
Constitution Act Amendment (Subordinate Legislation Committee) Act 1965	No. 7260	11 May 1965
An Act to amend Section Three hundred and fifty-five of The Constitution Act Amendment Act 1958. (Note: Constitution Act Amendment Act 1958 (No. 6224))
Aborigines (Amendment) Act 1965 (repealed)	No. 7267	18 May 1965
An Act to amend the Aborigines Act 1958. (Note: Aborigines Act 1958 (No. 6190)) (Repealed by Statute Law Revision Act 1995 (No. 11 of 1995))
Farm Produce Merchants and Commission Agents Act 1965	No. 7274	1 June 1965
An Act to consolidate and amend the Law relating to the Sale of Farm Produce.
National Parks (Amendment) Act 1965	No. 7275	1 June 1965
An Act to authorize the Surrender to the Crown of certain Lands held upon certain Trusts and the Reservation thereof as a Site for a National Park, to amend the National Parks Act 1958, (Note: National Parks Act 1958 (No. 6326)) and for other purposes.
	No. 7284	1 June 1965
An Act to apply out of the Consolidated Revenue the sum of Forty-three million eight hundred and seventy-seven thousand eight hundred and forty pounds to the service of the year One thousand nine hundred and sixty-five and One thousand nine hundred and sixty-six.
	No. 7285	1 June 1965
An Act to apply out of the Consolidated Revenue the sum of One million seven hundred and seventy-seven thousand five hundred and four pounds to the service of the year One thousand nine hundred and sixty-four and One thousand nine hundred and sixty-five.
Maintenance Act 1965	No. 7289	9 June 1965
An Act to consolidate and amend the Law relating to the Making of Orders for the Maintenance of Wives Husbands Children and Illegitimate Children and for Confinement, Medical and like Expenses and Funeral Expenses and for the Enforcement of such Orders and of similar Orders made in certain other States, Territories and Countries and for purposes connected therewith.
Victoria Institute of Colleges Act 1965 (repealed)	No. 7291	9 June 1965
An Act to constitute a Body Corporate under the Style and Title of the Victoria Institute of Colleges, and to confer on such Body Corporate such Powers as are necessary or expedient to co-ordinate and advance the Provision of Tertiary Education in certain Institutions. (Repealed by Post-Secondary Education (Amendment) Act 1980 (No. 9424))
	No. 7294	30 September 1965
An Act to apply out of the Consolidated Revenue the sum of Forty-six million two hundred and twenty-eight thousand one hundred and twenty pounds to the service of the year One thousand nine hundred and sixty-five and One thousand nine hundred and sixty-six.
Acts Interpretation Act 1965	No. 7295	12 October 1965
An Act to amend the Acts Interpretation Act 1958. (Note: Acts Interpretation Act 1958 (No. 6189))
Administration and Probate (Surviving Actions) Act 1965	No. 7296	12 October 1965
An Act to amend Sub-section (3) of Section Twenty-nine of the Administration and Probate Act 1958 (Note: Administration and Probate Act 1958 (No. 6191)) with respect to the Survival of Causes of Action in Tort against the Estates of Deceased Persons.
Agricultural Colleges (Cadetships) Act 1965	No. 7302	3 November 1965
An Act to amend the Agricultural Colleges Act 1958 (Note: Agricultural Colleges Act 1958 (No. 6194)) with respect to the Provision of Cadetships for certain Students, and for other purposes.
Echuca Stockyards Railway Construction Act 1965 (repealed)	No. 7306	16 November 1965
An Act to authorize the Construction of a Line of Railway to connect the Railway from Melbourne to the River Murray with Stockyards at Echuca and for other purposes. (Repealed by Transport Act 1983 (No. 9921))
Albert Park Lands Act 1965	No. 7309	23 November 1965
An Act relating to certain Lands at Albert Park in the Cities of South Melbourne and St. Kilda.
Apprenticeship (Amendment) Act 1965	No. 7312	23 November 1965
At Act to amend the Apprenticeship Act 1958, (Note: Apprenticeship Act 1958 (No. 6199)) and for other purposes.
Decimal Currency Act 1965	No. 7315	30 November 1965
An Act to amend the Law of Victoria in consequence of the Adoption of Decimal Currency in Australia, to make Provision for carrying the Adoption thereof into effect in Victoria, and for other purposes.
Water Supply Loan Application Act 1965 (repealed)	No. 7326	7 December 1965
An Act to sanction the Issue and Application of Loan Money for Works and other Purposes relating to Irrigation Water Supply Drainage Sewerage Flood Protection and River Improvement, and for other purposes. (Repealed by Treasury Legislation (Repeal) Act 2005 (No. 73 of 2005))
Statute Law Revision Act 1965	No. 7332	14 December 1965
An Act to revise the Statute Law.
Cul-de-sac Applications Act 1965	No. 7334	14 December 1965
An Act to make Provision with respect to Applications under Division Six of Part IV. of the Transfer of Land Act 1958 (Note: Transfer of Land Act 1958 (No. 6399)) and Matters arising out of those Applications, and for other purposes.
Poultry Levy (Collection Arrangement) Act 1965 (repealed)	No. 7341	14 December 1965
An Act to ratify validate approve and otherwise give effect to an Arrangement between the Minister of Primary Industry of the Commonwealth and the Minister of Agriculture of the State of Victoria with respect to the Collection of Poultry Levy in the said State, to empower the Egg and Egg Pulp Marketing Board to take all necessary steps to carry out the Arrangement, and for other purposes. (Repealed by Egg Industry Act 1989 (No. 49 of 1989))
Collusive Practices Act 1965	No. 7353	24 December 1965
An Act to prohibit certain Trade Practices and for other purposes.
Hospitals Superannuation Act 1965 (repealed)	No. 7354	14 December 1965
An Act to constitute a Hospitals Superannuation Board, to make Provision for the Establishment of a Hospitals Superannuation Fund, to provide for the Transfer of certain Funds and the Responsibility for the Administration of those Funds to the Board, and for other purposes. (Repealed by Hospitals Superannuation Act 1988 (No. 21 of 1988))
Psychological Practices Act 1965	No. 7355	14 December 1965
An Act to provide for the Registration of Psychologists, the Protection of the Public from Unqualified Persons and certain Harmful Practices and for other purposes.
Superannuation Act 1965	No. 7357	14 December 1965
An Act to amend the Superannuation Act 1958 (Note: Superannuation Act 1958 (No. 6386)) and for other purposes.
Universities (Amendment) Act 1965	No. 7362	21 December 1965
An Act to amend Section Seven of the La Trobe University Act 1964, (Note: La Trobe University Act 1964 (No. 7189)) the Monash University Act 1958, (Note: Monash University Act 1958 (No. 6184)) and the Short Title and Section Five of the University Act 1958 (Note: University Act 1958 (No. 6405)) and for other purposes.
Library Council of Victoria Act 1965	No. 7364	21 December 1965
An Act to constitute a Library Council of Victoria and to transfer thereto the Powers Functions and Duties of the Trustees of the State Library of Victoria and the Free Library Service Board, and for other purposes.
Lower Yarra Crossing Authority Act 1965	No. 7365	21 December 1965
An Act to confer certain Powers on the Lower Yarra Crossing Authority, and for other purposes.
	No. 7370	21 December 1965
An Act to apply out of the Consolidated Revenue the sum of One million five hundred and sixty-one thousand six hundred and eleven pounds to the service of the year One thousand nine hundred and sixty-four and One thousand nine hundred and sixty-five.
	No. 7371	21 December 1965
An Act to apply a sum out of the Consolidated Revenue to the service of the year ending on the thirtieth day of June One thousand nine hundred and sixty-six and to appropriate the Supplies granted in this and the last preceding Session of Parliament.
Bendigo Land (Special Grant) Act 1965	No.	
Cattle Compensation (Amendment) Act 1965	No.	
Children's Court (Admission to Hearings) Act 1965	No.	
Committees (Amendment) Act 1965	No.	
Companies (Amendment) Act 1965	No.	
Country Fire Authority (Service of Notices) Act 1965	No.	
Country Fire Authority Act 1965	No.	
Country Roads (Cadetships) Act 1965	No.	
Country Roads (Collection Costs) Act 1965	No.	
Crimes (Illegal Use of Motor Cars) Act 1965	No.	
Crimes (Parole) Act 1965	No.	
Dandenong Valley Authority (Amendment) Act 1965	No.	
Dried Fruits (Amendment) Act 1965	No.	
Electoral Provinces and Districts Act 1965	No.	
Electric Light and Power (Interstate Supplies) Act 1965	No.	
Evidence (Amendment) Act 1965	No.	
Evidence (Reproductions) Act 1965	No.	
Flinders-lane Alignments Act 1965	No.	
Forests (Amendment) Act 1965	No.	
Fuel and Power Act 1965	No.	
Gas Regulation (Amendment) Act 1965	No.	
Geelong (Kardinia Park) Land Act 1965	No.	
Geelong Harbor Trust Lands Act 1965	No.	
Grain Elevators (Borrowing Powers) Act 1965	No.	
Health (Household Insecticides) Act 1965	No.	
Health (Tuberculosis Arrangement) Act 1965	No.	
Home Finance (Amendment) Act 1965	No.	
Home Finance (Second Mortgages) Act 1965	No.	
Joint Select Committee (Drainage) Act 1965	No.	
Judges' Salaries and Allowances Act 1965	No.	
Justices (Amendment) Act 1965	No.	
Justices (Registration) Act 1965	No.	
Justices (Sentencing) Act 1965	No.	
Labour and Industry (Amendment) Act 1965	No.	
Labour and Industry Act 1965	No.	
Land Settlement and Rural Finance Act 1965	No.	
Land Tax (Rates) Act 1965	No.	
Legal Aid (Costs) Act 1965	No.	
Licensing Act 1965	No.	
Local Government (Amendment) Act 1965	No.	
Local Government (Brighton Land Reclamation) Act 1965	No.	
Local Government (Constitution of Municipalities) Act 1965	No.	
Marine (Amendment) Act 1965	No.	
Marketing of Primary Products (Egg Marketing) Act 1965	No.	
Medical (Foreign Practitioners) Act 1965	No.	
Melbourne and Metropolitan Board of Works (Borrowing Powers) Act 1965	No.	
Melbourne Harbor Trust (Amendment) Act 1965	No.	
Metropolitan Transportation Committee (Amendment) Act 1965	No.	
Mildura Irrigation and Water Trusts (Amendment) Act 1965	No.	
Milk and Dairy Supervision (Cheese Factory Licences) Act 1965	No.	
Mines (Regulations) Act 1965	No.	
Mordialloc Public Hall and Court House Act 1965	No.	
Motor Car (Driving Offence) Act 1965	No.	
Motor Car (Further Amendment) Act 1965	No.	
Motor Car (Portable Speed-measuring Devices) Act 1965	No.	
Motor Car Act 1965	No.	
Patriotic Funds (Amendment) Act 1965	No.	
Petroleum Products Subsidy Act 1965	No.	
Portland Harbor Trust (Amendment) Act 1965	No.	
Presbyterian Trusts (Common Fund) Act 1965	No.	
Property Law (Loans to Minors) Act 1965	No.	
Public Officers Act 1965	No.	
Public Officers Salaries and Allowances Act 1965	No.	
Public Works Loan Application Act 1965	No.	
Racing (Dog Racing) Act 1965	No.	
Racing (Totalizator Percentages) Act 1965	No.	
Railway Loan Application Act 1965	No.	
Railways (Amendment) Act 1965	No.	
Road Traffic (Infringements) Act 1965	No.	
Road Transport Act 1965	No.	
Roads (Special Projects) Act 1965	No.	
Rural Finance and Settlement Commission Act 1965	No.	
Sale of Land Act 1965	No.	
San Remo-Newhaven Land Act 1965	No.	
Social Welfare (Cadetships) Act 1965	No.	
St. Kilda Land Act 1965	No.	
Stamps (Amendment) Act 1965	No.	
Stamps (Bills of Exchange) Act 1965	No.	
Stamps Act 1965	No.	
State Electricity Commission (Chairman) Act 1965	No.	
State Forests Loan Application Act 1965	No.	
Subordinate Legislation (Amendment) Act 1965	No.	
Supreme Court (Judges) Act 1965	No.	
Survey Co-ordination (Place Names) Act 1965	No.	
Swine (Amendment) Act 1965	No.	
Teaching Service (Amendment) Act 1965	No.	
Tomato Processing Industry (Amendment) Act 1965	No.	
Tourist Resorts Act 1965	No.	
Transfer of Land (Removal of Caveats) Act 1965	No.	
Valuation of Land (Appeals) Act 1965	No.	
Valuation of Land (General Amendment) Act 1965	No.	
Veterinary Surgeons (Amendment) Act 1965	No.	
Veterinary Surgeons (Further Amendment) Act 1965	No.	
Water (Amendment) Act 1965	No.	
Water Authorities Accident Insurance Act 1965	No.	
Water Licences and Permits Act 1965	No.	
Weights and Measures (Amendment) Act 1965	No.	
Werribee Waterworks District (Abolition) Act 1965	No.	
Wills (Minors') Act 1965	No.	
Workers Compensation (Amendment) Act 1965	No.	

== Sources ==
- "1965 Victorian Historical Acts". AustLII.
