= List of acts of the Parliament of Victoria from 1960 =

This is a list of acts of the Parliament of Victoria, Australia for the year 1960.

== 1960 ==
Short title, or popular name	Citation	Royal assent
Long title
Anzac Day Act 1960	No. 6607	17 April 1960
An Act to amend the Law relating to Anzac Day.
Agricultural Lime (Amendment) Act 1960	No. 6608	3 May 1960
An Act to repeal Section Fourteen of the Agricultural Lime Act 1958. (Note: Agricultural Lime Act 1958 (No. 6196))
Church of England in Australia Constitution Act 1960 or the Anglican Church of Australia Constitution Act 1960	No. 6626	1 June 1960
An Act to give Legal Force and Effect within the State of Victoria to the Provisions of the Constitution of the Church of England in Australia contained in the Schedule to this Act, and for other purposes.
Acts Interpretation Act 1960	No. 6632	7 June 1960
An Act to amend the Acts Interpretation Act 1958 (Note: Acts Interpretation Act 1958 (No. 6189)) with respect to References to Acts or Provisions of Acts in the same or other Acts.
Administration and Probate (Offices) Act 1960	No. 6640	7 June 1960
An Act to amend the Administration and Probate Act 1958. (Note: Administration and Probate Act 1958 (No. 6191))
Social Welfare Act 1960	No. 6651	15 June 1960
An Act to establish a Social Welfare Branch of the Chief Secretary's Department and to make Provision with respect to the Functions of that Branch and for other purposes.
City of Melbourne Underground Railway Construction Act 1960	No. 6652	15 June 1960
An Act to authorize the Construction of an Underground Railway in the City of Melbourne and for other purposes.
Valuation of Land Act 1960	No. 6653	15 June 1960
An Act to provide for the Appointment of a Valuer-General and a Valuers' Qualification Board, and to make further Provision with regard to the Valuation of Land by Municipalities, to amend the Local Government Act 1958 (Note: Local Government Act 1958 (No. 6299)) and for other purposes.
	No. 6656	15 June 1960
An Act to apply out of the Consolidated Revenue the sum of Thirty-two million four hundred and forty-two thousand one hundred and sixty-four pounds to the service of the year One thousand nine hundred and sixty and One thousand nine hundred and sixty-one.
	No. 6657	15 June 1960
An Act to apply out of the Consolidated Revenue the sum of Three million one hundred and three thousand two hundred and ninety pounds to the service of the year One thousand nine hundred and fifty-nine and One thousand nine hundred and sixty.
	No. 6660	30 September 1960
An Act to apply out of the Consolidated Revenue the sum of Three hundred and twenty-three thousand eight hundred and sixty pounds to the service of the year One thousand nine hundred and fifty-nine and One thousand nine hundred and sixty.
	No. 6661	30 September 1960
An Act to apply out of the Consolidated Revenue the sum of Thirty-three million five hundred and eighty-eight thousand three hundred and forty-five pounds to the service of the year One thousand nine hundred and sixty and One thousand nine hundred and sixty-one.
Constitution Act Amendment (Expenses) Act 1960	No. 6667	8 November 1960
An Act to amend Section Sixty-six of The Constitution Act Amendment Act 1958. (Note: Constitution Act Amendment Act 1958 (No. 6224))
Gippsland Railway Deviation Act 1960 (repealed)	No. 6669	8 November 1960
An Act to authorize the Construction of a Deviation on the Gippsland Railway. (Repealed by Transport Act 1983 (No. 9921))
Hamilton Stockyards Railway Construction Act 1960 (repealed)	No. 6670	8 November 1960
An Act to authorize the Construction of a Line of Railway to connect the Hamilton and Coleraine Railway with Stockyards at Hamilton and for other purposes. (Repealed by Transport Act 1983 (No. 9921))
Audit (Amendment) Act 1960	No. 6684	6 December 1960
An Act to amend the Audit Act 1958, (Note: Audit Act 1958 (No. 6203)) the Public Account Act 1958, (Note: Public Account Act 1958 (No. 6345)) and Section Thirty-six of the Superannuation Act 1958. (Note: Superannuation Act 1958 (No. 6386))
State Library National Gallery National Museum and Institute of Applied Science Act 1960	No. 6688	6 December 1960
An Act to alter the Titles of the Public Library and the Museum of Applied Science and to consolidate and amend the Law relating thereto and to the National Gallery and the National Museum of Victoria, and for other purposes.
Constitution Act Amendment (Treating) Act 1960	No. 6690	13 December 1960
An Act relating to Treating at Elections.
Geelong and Colac Railway (Deviation) Act 1960 (repealed)	No. 6697	13 December 1960
An Act to authorize the Construction of a Deviation on the Geelong and Colac Railway. (Repealed by Transport Act 1983 (No. 9921))
University Colleges Lands Act 1960	No. 6698	13 December 1960
An Act relating to the Lands occupied by Queen's College, Ormond College and Newman College respectively, being Colleges affiliated to the University of Melbourne.
Navigable Waters (Oil Pollution) Act 1960	No. 6705	13 December 1960
An Act relating to the Prevention of the Pollution of Navigable Waters by Oil, and for purposes connected therewith.
Water Supply Loan Application Act 1960 (repealed)	No. 6708	13 December 1960
An Act to sanction the Issue and Application of Loan Money for Works and other Purposes relating to Irrigation Water Supply Drainage Sewerage Flood Protection and River Improvement, and for other purposes. (Repealed by Treasury Legislation (Repeal) Act 2005 (No. 73 of 2005))
National Fitness Council of Victoria Act 1960	No. 6713	13 December 1960
An Act to make Provision with respect to the Incorporation of a National Fitness Council of Victoria and the Objects and Powers thereof and for other purposes.
Explosives Act 1960 (repealed)	No. 6715	21 December 1960
An Act to re-enact with Amendments the Law relating to the Manufacture Transportation Storage Sale Importation and Use of Explosives and the Investigation of Explosions. (Repealed by Dangerous Goods Act 1985 (No. 10189))
Statute Law Revision Act 1960	No. 6716	21 December 1960
An Act to revise the Statute Law.
	No. 6735	22 December 1960
An Act to apply a sum out of the Consolidated Revenue to the service of the year ending on the thirtieth day of June One thousand nine hundred and sixty-one and to appropriate the Supplies granted in this and the last preceding Session of Parliament.
Barwon Heads Lands Exchange Act 1960	No.	
Building Societies (Amendment) Act 1960	No.	
Business Names (Public Borrowings) Act 1960	No.	
Cancer (Amendment) Act 1960	No.	
Cattle Compensation (Amendment) Act 1960	No.	
Children's Court (Enforcement of Awards) Act 1960	No.	
Co-operative Housing Societies (Amendment) Act 1960	No.	
Co-operative Housing Societies (Guarantees) Act 1960	No.	
Coal Canal Bridge Act 1960	No.	
Coal Mines (Pensions Contributions) Act 1960	No.	
Coal Mines (Pensions) Act 1960	No.	
Companies (Fees) Act 1960	No.	
Companies Act 1960	No.	
Country Fire Authority (Sawmill Burners) Act 1960	No.	
Crimes (Kidnapping) Act 1960	No.	
Dried Fruits (Amendment) Act 1960	No.	
Electoral Provinces Act 1960	No.	
Entertainments Tax (Amendment) Act 1960	No.	
Estate Agents (Amendment) Act 1960	No.	
Fisheries (Change of Title) Act 1960	No.	
Fisheries (Crayfish) Act 1960	No.	
Friendly Societies (Dental Clinics) Act 1960	No.	
Fruit and Vegetables (Road Barriers) Act 1960	No.	
Game (Licences) Act 1960	No.	
Geelong Harbor Trust (Freezing Works Agreement) Act 1960	No.	
Geelong Waterworks and Sewerage (Amendment) Act 1960	No.	
Health (Amendment) Act 1960	No.	
Health (Tuberculosis Arrangement) Act 1960	No.	
Home Finance (Loans to Minors) Act 1960	No.	
Housing (Powers) Act 1960	No.	
Industrial Safety Advisory Council Act 1960	No.	
John Storey Memorial Fund Act 1960	No.	
Judges Salaries and Allowances Act 1960	No.	
Justices (Bail) Act 1960	No.	
Labour and Industry (Amendment) Act 1960	No.	
Labour and Industry (Butchers' Shops) Act 1960	No.	
Land (Public Authorities) Act 1960	No.	
Land Tax (Rates) Act 1960	No.	
Land Tax (Relief) Act 1960	No.	
Landlord and Tenant (Further Amendment) Act 1960	No.	
Latrobe Valley (Financial) Act 1960	No.	
Legal Profession Practice (Amendment) Act 1960	No.	
Licensing (Amendment) Act 1960	No.	
Licensing (Fees) Act 1960	No.	
Local Authorities Superannuation (Amendment) Act 1960	No.	
Local Government (Disqualification) Act 1960	No.	
Local Government (Keilor Waverley and Springvale) Act 1960	No.	
Local Government (Preston Streets Agreement) Act 1960	No.	
Local Government (Private Street) Act 1960	No.	
Local Government (Scaffolding Inspection) Act 1960	No.	
Marketing of Primary Products (Members) Act 1960	No.	
Medical (Amendment) Act 1960	No.	
Medical (Blood Transfusion) Act 1960	No.	
Melbourne and Geelong Mortgages Act 1960	No.	
Melbourne and Metropolitan Board of Works (Borrowing Powers) Act 1960	No.	
Melbourne Harbor Trust Lands Act 1960	No.	
Metropolitan Fire Brigades (Borrowing Powers) Act 1960	No.	
Milk and Dairy Supervision (Research Contributions) Act 1960	No.	
Milk Board (Amendment) Act 1960	No.	
Milk Board (Powers) Act 1960	No.	
Ministry of Transport (Railway Officers) Act 1960	No.	
Monash University (Amendment) Act 1960	No.	
Motor Car (Abolition of Owners' Certificates) Act 1960	No.	
Motor Car (Amendment) Act 1960	No.	
Motor Car (Commencement) Act 1960	No.	
Motor Car (Driving) Act 1960	No.	
Motor Car (Insurance Surcharge Continuance) Act 1960	No.	
Motor Car (Third-Party Insurance) Act 1960	No.	
National Parks (Amendment) Act 1960	No.	
Northcote School Act 1960	No.	
Nurses (Amendment) Act 1960	No.	
Police Offences (Amendment) Act 1960	No.	
Police Regulation (Pensions) Act 1960	No.	
Public Officers Salaries and Allowances Act 1960	No.	
Public Works Loan Application Act 1960	No.	
Racing (Dog Races) Act 1960	No.	
Racing (Totalizators Extension) Act 1960	No.	
Racing (Trotting Races) Act 1960	No.	
Railway Loan Application Act 1960	No.	
Revocation of Crown Reservations Act 1960	No.	
Road Traffic (Amendment) Act 1960	No.	
Sale of Allotments of Land (Amendment) Act 1960	No.	
Sewerage Districts (Amendment) Act 1960	No.	
Stamps (Amendment) Act 1960	No.	
State Electricity Commission (Borrowing) Act 1960	No.	
State Forests Loan Application Act 1960	No.	
Superannuation (Additions to Pensions) Act 1960	No.	
Supreme Court (Orders) Act 1960	No.	
Supreme Court (Proceedings before Master) Act 1960	No.	
Surplus Revenue Act 1960	No.	
Tourist (Amendment) Act 1960	No.	
Tower Hill and Malmsbury Lands Act 1960	No.	
Town and Country Planning (Amendment) Act 1960	No.	
Transfer of Land (Stratum Estates) Act 1960	No.	
Transport Regulation (Qualifications of Chairman) Act 1960	No.	
Trustee Companies (Amalgamation) Act 1960	No.	
Vermin and Noxious Weeds (Financial) Act 1960	No.	
Victoria Racing Club (Amendment) Act 1960	No.	
Water (Amendment) Act 1960	No.	
Wattle Park Land Act 1960	No.	
Weights and Measures (Penalties) Act 1960	No.	
Western Metropolitan Market (Amendment) Act 1960	No.	
Wodonga Lands Exchange Act 1960	No.	

== Sources ==
- "1960 Victorian Historical Acts". AustLII.
