= List of acts of the Parliament of Victoria from 1948 =

This is a list of acts of the Parliament of Victoria, Australia for the year 1948.

== 1948 ==
Short title, or popular name	Citation	Royal assent
Long title
Camberwell Lands Act 1948 (repealed)	No. 5268	30 June 1948
An Act to provide, upon the Transfer and Surrender to His Majesty of certain Land at Burwood, for the Reservation of that Land as a Site for a Public Park and Children's Playground, for the Excision of a Part of certain Land at Camberwell permanently reserved as a Site for Public Gardens and for the Reservation of the Land so Excised, together with the Land forming the existing Town Hall Site at Camberwell, as a Site for a Town Hall and for Municipal Purposes. (Repealed by Statute Law Revision Act 1984 (No. 10087))
	No. 5269	30 June 1948
An Act to apply out of the Consolidated Revenue the sum of Five million four hundred and thirty-seven thousand three hundred and seventeen pounds to the service of the year One thousand nine hundred and forty-eight and One thousand nine hundred and forty-nine.
Coranderrk Lands Act 1948	No. 5274	20 July 1948
An Act to validate the Crown Grants of certain Lands at Coranderrk in the Parish of Gracedale and to revoke the Permanent Reservation of certain other Land thereat as a Site for the use of the Aborigines, and for other purposes. (Repealed by Statute Law Revision Act 1984 (No. 10087))
Administration and Probate (Amendment) Act 1948	No. 5277	26 July 1948
An Act to amend the Law relating to the Administration of the Estates of Deceased Persons.
Statute Law Revision Committee Act 1948	No. 5285	6 August 1948
An Act to make Provision with respect to a Joint Statute Law Revision Committee of the Legislative Council and the Legislative Assembly.
Commonwealth Transferred Officers Act 1948	No. 5294	24 August 1948
An Act relating to the Application of the Superannuation Acts and of Section Sixty-four of the Public Service Act 1946 (Note: Public Service Act 1946 (No. 5124)) to certain Officers transferred from the Service of the Commonwealth.
Health (Hospitals) Act 1948	No. 5301	31 August 1948
An Act to amend Part VIII. of the Health Act 1928. (Note: Health Act 1928 (19 Geo. V. No. 3697))
	No. 5305	31 August 1948
An Act to apply out of the Consolidated Revenue the sum of Eleven million one hundred and ninety-seven thousand seven hundred and thirty-seven pounds to the service of the year One thousand nine hundred and forty-eight and One thousand nine hundred and forty-nine.
	No. 5306	31 August 1948
An Act to apply out of the Consolidated Revenue the sum of Seven hundred and fifty-nine thousand six hundred and sixty-six pounds to the service of the year One thousand nine hundred and forty-seven and One thousand nine hundred and forty-eight.
Thornbury Land Act 1948 (repealed)	No. 5319	7 September 1948
An Act to provide for the Grant of a Lease of certain Crown Land at Thornbury, being part of the Land known as the Thornbury Estate, to the Glen Iris Brick Tile and Terra Cotta Company Proprietary Limited, and for other purposes. (Repealed by Statute Law Revision Act 1984 (No. 10087))
Gippsland Railway (Duplication and Regrading) Act 1948 (repealed)	No. 5323	7 September 1948
An Act to authorize the Duplication and Regrading by The Victorian Railways Commissioners of Part of the Gippsland Railway and for purposes connected therewith. (Repealed by Transport Act 1983 (No. 9921))
Statute Law Revision Act 1948	No. 5331	30 November 1948
An Act to revise the Statute Law and for other purposes.
Administration and Probate Duties Act 1948	No. 5339	7 December 1948
An Act to continue the Operation of Part III. of the Finance Act 1930. (Note: Finance Act 1930 (No. 3889))
Alphington to East Preston Railway Construction Act 1948 (repealed)	No. 5345	21 December 1948
An Act to authorize the Construction of a Line of Railway from Alphington to East Preston. (Repealed by Alphington to East Preston Railway Construction (Housing) Act 1959 (No. 6562))
Moe to Yallourn Railway Construction Act 1948 (repealed)	No. 5352	21 December 1948
An Act to authorize the Construction of a Line of Railway from Moe to Yallourn. (Repealed by Transport Act 1983 (No. 9921))
Fern Tree Gully and Gembrook Railway (Reconstruction) Act 1948 (repealed)	No. 5355	21 December 1948
An Act to authorize the Conversion to wider Gauge and the Electrification of the Fern Tree Gully and Gembrook Railway and the Construction of Deviations from the Line of such Railway, and for purposes connected therewith. (Repealed by Transport Act 1983 (No. 9921))
	No. 5360	21 December 1948
An Act to apply a sum out of the Consolidated Revenue to the service of the year ending on the thirtieth day of June One thousand nine hundred and forty-nine and to appropriate Supplies granted in this Session of Parliament.
Barley Marketing Act 1948	No.	
Building Operations (Amendment) Act 1948	No.	
Building Operations and Building Materials Control (Amendment) Act 1948	No.	
Building Operations Control (Amendment) Act 1948	No.	
Cancer Institute Act 1948	No.	
Carriers and Innkeepers Act 1948	No.	
Closer Settlement (Disposal of Land) Act 1948	No.	
Co-operative Housing Societies Act 1948	No.	
Coal (Overseas Purchase) Land and Application Act 1948	No.	
Coal Mine Workers Pensions Act 1948	No.	
Coroners (Medical Witnesses) Act 1948	No.	
Country Roads (Permanent Works) Act 1948	No.	
Country Roads (Works and Evidence) Act 1948	No.	
Country Roads Act 1948	No.	
Country Roads Board Fund (Amendment) Act 1948	No.	
Essential Services Act 1948	No.	
Farmers Debts Adjustment (Board) Act 1948	No.	
Fire Brigades (Borrowing and Salaries) Act 1948	No.	
Forests (Amendment) Act 1948	No.	
Forests (Land Acquisition) Act 1948	No.	
Friendly Societies (War Service) Repeal Act 1948	No.	
Gas Regulation (Amendment) Act 1948	No.	
Geelong Harbor Trust (Land) Act 1948	No.	
Hepburn Springs Land Act 1948	No.	
Hide and Leather Industries Act 1948	No.	
Horse Breeding (Amendment) Act 1948	No.	
Hospital Benefits Act 1948	No.	
Hospitals and Charities Act1948	No.	
Housing Act 1948	No.	
Justices (Courts) Act 1948	No.	
Land (Leases) Act 1948	No.	
Land Tax Act 1948	No.	
Landlord and Tenant (Amendment) Act 1948	No.	
Landlord and Tenant Act 1948	No.	
Latrobe-street Tramway Construction Act 1948	No.	
Local Authorities Superannuation (Amendment) Act 1948	No.	
Local Government (Footscray Street Construction) Act 1948	No.	
Local Government (Streets) Act 1948	No.	
Marine (Pilotage Rates) Act 1948	No.	
Master of the Supreme Court Act 1948	No.	
Melbourne and Metropolitan Tramways (Financial) Act 1948	No.	
Melbourne Harbor Trust (Chairman's Salary) Act 1948	No.	
Melbourne North Land Act 1948	No.	
Midwives (Amendment) Act 1948	No.	
Mildura Irrigation and Water Trusts (Amendment) Act 1948	No.	
Miners' Phthisis (Treasury Allowances) Amendment Act 1948	No.	
Municipal Endowment (Temporary Discontinuance) Act 1948	No.	
Non-Contributory State Pensions Act 1948	No.	
North-West Mallee Settlement Areas Act 1948	No.	
Nurses (Registration) Act 1948	No.	
Parliamentary Contributory Retirement Fund Act 1948	No.	
Parliamentary Salaries and Allowances Act 1948	No.	
Parliamentary Salaries and Allowances Act 1948 (No. 2)	No.	
Police Offences (Race-meetings) Act 1948	No.	
Police Regulation (Amendment) Act 1948	No.	
Prices Regulation (Amendment) Act 1948	No.	
Prices Regulation Act 1948	No.	
Public Officers Salaries Act 1948	No.	
Public Trustee Act 1948	No.	
Public Works Committee Act 1948	No.	
Public Works Loan and Application (Amendment) Act 1948	No.	
Public Works Loan and Application Act 1948	No.	
Railway Land and Application Act 1948	No.	
Railways (Amendment) Act 1948	No.	
Railways Standardization Agreement Act 1948	No.	
Revocation and Excision of Crown Reservations Act 1948	No.	
River Improvement Act 1948	No.	
Shrine of Remembrance Trustees Act 1948	No.	
Stamps (Increased Duty Continuance) Act 1948	No.	
State Electricity Commission Act 1948	No.	
State Forests Loan and Application Act 1948	No.	
State Savings Bank Act 1948	No.	
Stipendiary Magistrates Act 1948	No.	
Teaching Service (Amendment) Act 1948	No.	
Teaching Service (Application of Enactments) Act 1948	No.	
Town and Country Planning Act 1948	No.	
Transfer of Land (Acquisitions) Act 1948	No.	
Treasury Bonds Act 1948	No.	
Vegetation Diseases (Fruit Fly) Act 1948	No.	
Water Supply Loans Application Act 1948	No.	
Wheat Industry Stablization Act 1948	No.	
Workers' Compensation (Police Force) Act 1948	No.	

== Sources ==
- "1948 Victorian Historical Acts". AustLII.
