= List of acts of the Parliament of Victoria from 1957 =

This is a list of acts of the Parliament of Victoria, Australia for the year 1957.

== 1957 ==
Short title, or popular name	Citation	Royal assent
Long title
Trinity College Act 1957	No. 6057	14 May 1957
An Act Relating to a College affiliated to and connected with the University of Melbourne and known as Trinity College.
Public Works Loan Application Act 1957 (Note: There were two acts given the short title 'Public Works Loan Application Act 1957', No. 6066 and No. 6169.) (repealed)	No. 6066	
(Repealed by Treasury Legislation (Repeal) Act 2005 (No. 73 of 2005))
Police Offences Act 1957	No. 6069	28 May 1957
An Act to consolidate the Law relating to Police Offences.
Racing Act 1957	No. 6070	28 May 1957
An Act to consolidate the Law relating to Horse Pony Trotting and Dog Racing, the Registration of Bookmakers and their Clerks, and Totalizators.
Yinnar Lands Act 1957 (repealed)	No. 6071	28 May 1957
An Act to provide, upon the Surrender to Her Majesty of certain Land in the Parish of Yinnar, for the Reservation thereof as a Site for Public Recreation, and for the Revocation of the Reservation of certain other Land in the said Parish temporarily reserved as a Site for Public Recreation, and for the Grant thereof to the President Councillors and Ratepayers of the Shire of Morwell, and for other purposes. (Repealed by Statute Law Revision Act 1984 (No. 10087))
Sandringham to Black Rock Electric Street Railway (Dismantling) Act 1957 (repealed)	No. 6072	28 May 1957
An Act relating to the Dismantling of the Sandringham to Black Rock Electric Street Railway, and for other purposes. (Repealed by Transport Act 1983 (No. 9921))
Housing (Commonwealth and State Agreement) Act 1957	No. 6075	28 May 1957
An Act to ratify and approve the Execution for and on behalf of the State of Victoria of an Agreement between the Commonwealth of Australia and the several States of Australia in relation to Housing Projects, and for other purposes.
	No. 6077	28 May 1957
An Act to apply out of the Consolidated Revenue the sum of Twenty-six million one hundred and thirteen thousand eight hundred and forty-five pounds to the service of the year One thousand nine hundred and fifty-seven and One thousand nine hundred and fifty-eight.
Aborigines Act 1957	No. 6086	11 June 1957
An Act relating to the Aboriginal Natives of Victoria, and for other purposes.
Administration and Probate (Amendment) Act 1957	No. 6089	11 June 1957
An Act to amend Sections Seven and Fifty-one of the Administration and Probate Act 1928. (Note: Administration and Probate Act 1928 (19 Geo. V. No. 3632))
Housing Act 1957	No. 6090	19 June 1957
An Act to amend the Housing Acts, and for other purposes.
Transport (Westernport Bay) Act 1957 (repealed)	No. 6095	19 June 1957
An Act to provide for the Licensing of certain Boats operating in or near Westernport Bay and for other purposes. (Repealed by Transport Act 1983 (No. 9921))
	No. 6099	1 October 1957
An Act to apply out of the Consolidated Revenue the sum of Twenty-seven million three hundred and eighty-three thousand nine hundred and eighty-five pounds to the service of the year One thousand nine hundred and fifty-seven and One thousand nine hundred and fifty-eight.
	No. 6102	22 October 1957
An Act to apply out of the Consolidated Revenue the sum of Two million nine hundred and fourteen thousand seven hundred and forty-four pounds to the service of the year One thousand nine hundred and fifty-six and One thousand nine hundred and fifty-seven.
Coal Mine Workers Pensions (Amendment) Act 1957	No. 6110	6 November 1957
An Act to amend the Coal Mine Workers Pensions Act 1942. (Note: Coal Mine Workers Pensions Act 1942 (No. 4932))
Audit Act 1957	No. 6111	6 November 1957
An Act relating to the Collection and Payment of the Public Moneys the Audit of the Public Account and other Accounts and the Protection and Recovery of the Public Property, and for other purposes.
Statute Law Revision Act 1957	No. 6112	12 November 1957
An Act to revise the Statute Law and for other purposes.
Exhibition Act 1957	No. 6120	20 November 1957
An Act relating to the Administration and Control of the Exhibition, and for other purposes.
Acts Interpretation (Service by Post) Act 1957	No. 6126	20 November 9157
An Act to amend Section Twenty-four of the Acts Interpretation Act 1928. (Note: Acts Interpretation Act 1928 (19 Geo. V. No. 3630))
Bendigo Land Act 1957 (repealed)	No. 6131	3 December 1957
An Act to provide for the Purchase of certain Crown Land situate in the City of Bendigo by the Trustees of the Bendigo Branch No. 5 of the Australian Natives Association and for the Crown Grant thereof to the said Branch. (Repealed by Statute Law Revision Act 1984 (No. 10087))
Swan Hill Railway Land Act 1957 (repealed)	No. 6133	3 December 1957
An Act with respect to certain Railway Land at Swan Hill required for Educational purposes. (Repealed by Transport Act 1983 (No. 9921))
Constitution Act Amendment (Special Appropriations) Act 1957	No. 6135	3 December 1957
An Act relating to the Expenses of the Executive Council and the Legislative Council.
Co-operative Housing Societies Act 1957	No. 6138	10 December 1957
An Act to consolidate and amend the Law relating to the Formation Registration and Management of Co-operative Housing Societies and to the Making by the Treasurer of Victoria of Certain Guarantees and Indemnities in connexion with such Societies, and for other purposes.
Water Supply Loan Application Act 1957 (repealed)	No. 6152	18 December 1957
An Act to sanction the Issue and Application of Loan Money for Works and other Purposes relating to Irrigation Water Supply Drainage Sewerage Flood Protection and River Improvement, and for other purposes. (Repealed by Treasury Legislation (Repeal) Act 2005 (No. 73 of 2005))
State Forests Loan Application Act 1957 (repealed)	No. 6153	18 December 1957
An Act to sanction the Issue and Application of Loan Money for Works and other Purposes relating to State Forests. (Repealed by Statute Law Revision Act 1984 (No. 10087))
King-street Bridge Act 1957	No. 6156	18 December 1957
An Act relating to the Construction of a Bridge over the River Yarra at or near King-street Melbourne, and for other purposes.
Railway Loan Application Act 1957 (repealed)	No. 6158	18 December 1957
An Act to sanction the Issue and Application of Loan Money for Works and Purposes relating to Railways, and for other purposes. (Repealed by Transport Act 1983 (No. 9921))
Fraser National Park Act 1957	No. 6160	18 December 1957
An Act to transfer certain Land at Eildon from the State Rivers and Water Supply Commission to the Crown and to reserve that Land and certain Lands of the Crown as a Site for a National Park, and for other purposes.
Shepparton Lands Act 1957 (repealed)	No. 6164	18 December 1957
An Act to provide, upon the Surrender to Her Majesty of certain Land in the Parish of Shepparton, for the Reservation thereof as a Site for Municipal Buildings, and for the Revocation of the Reservation of certain other Land in the said Parish temporarily reserved as a Site for Municipal Buildings, and for the Grant thereof to the Mayor Councillors and Citizens of the City of Shepparton, and for other purposes. (Repealed by Statute Law Revision Act 1984 (No. 10087))
Elphinstone Lands Exchange Act 1957 (repealed)	No. 6165	18 December 1957
An Act to provide for the Revocation of the Reservation of certain Land in the Parish of Elphinstone temporarily reserved as a Site for Public Recreation and for the Exchange thereof for certain other Land in the said Parish to be reserved as a Site for Public Recreation. (Repealed by Statute Law Revision Act 1984 (No. 10087))
Public Works Loan Application Act 1957 (repealed)	No. 6169	18 December 1957
An Act to sanction the Issue and Application of Loan Money for Public Works and other purposes. (Repealed by Treasury Legislation (Repeal) Act 2005 (No. 73 of 2005))
	No. 6170	20 December 1957
An Act to apply a sum out of the Consolidated Revenue to the service of the year ending on the thirtieth day of June One thousand nine hundred and fifty-eight and to appropriate the Supplies granted in this Session of Parliament.
Barley Marketing (Amendment) Act 1957	No.	
Benefit Associations (Amendment) Act 1957	No.	
Cemeteries (Financial) Act 1957	No.	
Clean Air Act 1957	No.	
Country Fire Authority (Amendment) Act 1957	No.	
Country Roads (Amendment) Act 1957	No.	
County Court Act 1957	No.	
Crimes (Amendment) Act 1957	No.	
Crimes (Parole Board) Act 1957	No.	
Crimes Act 1957	No.	
Dental Hospital (Finance) Act 1957	No.	
Dog Act 1957	No.	
Dried Fruits (Amendment) Act 1957	No.	
Education Act 1957	No.	
Estate Agents (Amendment) Act 1957	No.	
Firearms (Pistols) Act 1957	No.	
Foot and Mouth Disease Eradication Fund Act 1957	No.	
Forests (Mount Buller Lease) Act 1957	No.	
Forests Act 1957	No.	
Friendly Societies (Amendment) Act 1957	No.	
Fruit and Vegetables (Inspection) Act 1957	No.	
Game (Amendment) Act 1957	No.	
Game (Destruction) Act 1957	No.	
Geelong Harbor Trust (Amendment) Act 1957	No.	
Geelong Waterworks and Sewerage (Bellarine Officers) Act 1957	No.	
Grain Elevators (Border Railways) Act 1957	No.	
Judicial Proceedings (Regulation of Reports) Act 1957	No.	
Juries (Amendment) Act 1957	No.	
Justices (Amendment) Act 1957	No.	
Justices Act 1957	No.	
Labour and Industry (Amendment) Act 1957	No.	
Labour and Industry (Carriage of Bees) Act 1957	No.	
Labour and Industry (Long Service Leave) Act 1957	No.	
Land (Resumption) Act 1957	No.	
Land Tax (Rates) Act 1957	No.	
Landlord and Tenant (Control) Act 1957	No.	
Liquified Petroleum Gas Act 1957	No.	
Local Government (Amendment) Act 1957	No.	
Local Government Act 1957	No.	
Maintenance (Consolidation) Act 1957	No.	
Maintenance Act 1957	No.	
Masseurs (Registration) Act 1957	No.	
Medical (Registration) Act 1957	No.	
Melbourne and Metropolitan Board of Works (Contributions) Act 1957	No.	
Melbourne and Metropolitan Board of Works (Extension and Advances) Act 1957	No.	
Melbourne Cricket Ground (Trustees) Act 1957	No.	
Moorabbin Land Act 1957	No.	
Mornington Land Act 1957	No.	
Motor Car (Amendment) Act 1957	No.	
Motor Car (Registration Fees) Act 1957	No.	
Police Offences (Cruelty to Animals) Act 1957	No.	
Police Offences (Prostitution) Act 1957	No.	
Police Offences (Unlawful Use of Boats) Act 1957	No.	
Police Regulation (Amendment) Act 1957	No.	
Port Melbourne Lagoon Lands Act 1957	No.	
Pounds (Fees) Act 1957	No.	
Property Law (Amendment) Act 1957	No.	
Public Account (Amendment) Act 1957	No.	
Public Service (Amendment) Act 1957	No.	
Rabbit (Biological Destruction) Act 1957	No.	
Railways (Furlough) Amendment Act 1957	No.	
Railways (Level Crossings) Act 1957	No.	
Revenue Deficit Funding Act 1957	No.	
Soil Conservation and Land Utilization (River Flats) Act 1957	No.	
Solicitor-General (Pension) Act 1957	No.	
Stamps (Hire-Purchase Agreements) Amendment Act 1957	No.	
Stamps Act 1957	No.	
State Electricity Commission (Borrowing) Act 1957	No.	
State Electricity Commission (Land Compensation) Act 1957	No.	
State Savings Bank (Amendment) Act 1957	No.	
Teaching Service (Amendment) Act 1957	No.	
Tourist Act 1957	No.	
Trotting Races Act 1957	No.	
Trustee Companies Act 1957	No.	
Vermin and Noxious Weeds (Financial) Act 1957	No.	
Vermin and Noxious Weeds Act 1957	No.	
Victorian Inland Meat Authority (Financial) Act 1957	No.	
Wangaratta (Rating on Unimproved Values) Act 1957	No.	
Water (Amendment) Act 1957	No.	
Weights and Measures (Amendment) Act 1957	No.	
Wodonga (Unimproved Rating Poll) Act 1957	No.	

== Sources ==
- "1957 Victorian Historical Acts". AustLII.
