= List of acts of the Parliament of Victoria from 1906 =

This is a list of acts of the Parliament of Victoria, Australia for the year 1906.

== 1906 ==
Short title, or popular name	Citation	Royal assent
Long title
	6 Edw. VII. No. 2017	11 July 1906
An Act to apply out of the Consolidated Revenue the sum of One million and twenty-two thousand eight hundred and sixty-eight pounds to the service of the year One thousand nine hundred and six and One thousand nine hundred and seven.
	6 Edw. VII. No. 2018	31 July 1906
An Act to apply out of the Consolidated Revenue the sum of One hundred and forty-five thousand four hundred and seventy-seven pounds to the service of the year One thousand nine hundred and five and One thousand nine hundred and six.
Talbot Colony for Epileptics Act 1906	6 Edw. VII. No. 2019	9 August 1906
An Act to amend The Talbot Colony for Epileptics Act 1905 (Note: Talbot Colony for Epileptics Act 1905 (5 Edw. VII. No. 2015)) and for other purposes.
Redbank Recreation Reserve Act 1906	6 Edw. VII. No. 2020	9 August 1906
An Act to revoke the Permanent Reservation of certain Land in the parish of Stratford known as the Redbank Recreation Reserve.
Hamilton Land Act 1906	6 Edw. VII. No. 2021	9 August 1906
An Act to provide for the Resumption by the Crown of certain Land in the Borough of Hamilton.
Trusts Act 1906	6 Edw. VII. No. 2022	11 September 1906
An Act to amend the Law relating to Investment by Trustees in Government and Public Securities.
Opium Smoking Prohibition Act 1906 (repealed)	6 Edw. VII. No. 2023	11 September 1906
An Act to amend the Opium Smoking Prohibition Act 1905. (Note: Opium Smoking Prohibition Act 1905 (5 Edw. VII. No. 2003)) (Repealed by Poisons Act 1915 (6 Geo. V. No. 2707))
	6 Edw. VII. No. 2024	11 September 1906
An Act to repeal the South Melbourne Land Act 1905. (Note: South Melbourne Land Act 1905 (5 Edw. VII. No. 2004))
Municipal Endowment Act 1906	6 Edw. VII. No. 2025	11 September 1906
An Act relating to the Municipal Endowment.
Victorian Loans Redemption and Conversion Act 1906 (repealed)	6 Edw. VII. No. 2026	11 September 1906
An Act to provide for Creating or Issuing Victorian Government Stock or Victorian Government Debentures when required for paying off re-purchasing or redeeming Government Securities or for exchanging therefor. (Repealed by Treasury Legislation (Repeal) Act 2005 (No. 73 of 2005))
Borhoneyghurk Land Act 1906	6 Edw. VII. No. 2027	11 September 1906
An Act to revoke the permanent Reservation of Timber Reserve, Parish of Borhoneyghurk.
Juvenile Smoking Prevention Act 1906 (repealed)	6 Edw. VII. No. 2028	11 September 1906
An Act to provide for the Prevention of Juvenile Smoking. (Repealed by Police Offences Act 1915 (6 Geo. V. No. 2708))
Surplus Revenue Act 1906	6 Edw. VII. No. 2029	25 September 1906
An Act relating to the Surplus Revenue of the Financial Year ended on the thirtieth day of June One thousand nine hundred and six.
Income Tax Act 1906 (repealed)	6 Edw. VII. No. 2030	25 September 1906
An Act to declare the Rates of Income Tax for the Year ending on the thirty-first day of December One thousand nine hundred and seven and for other purposes. (Repealed by Income Tax Act 1915 (6 Geo. V. No. 2668))
	6 Edw. VII. No. 2031	25 September 1906
An Act to apply out of the Consolidated Revenue the sum of Seven hundred and fifty-six thousand one hundred pounds to the service of the year One thousand nine hundred and six and One thousand nine hundred and seven.
Administration and Probate Duties Act 1906 (repealed)	6 Edw. VII. No. 2032	9 October 1906
An Act Relating to Duties payable under the Administration and Probate Acts. (Repealed by Administration and Probate Act 1915 (6 Geo. V. No. 2611))
Drainage Areas Act 1906 (repealed)	6 Edw. VII. No. 2033	9 October 1906
An Act to amend the Drainage Areas Act 1905. (Note: Drainage Areas Act 1905 (5 Edw. VII. No. 2002)) (Repealed by Drainage Areas Act 1915 (6 Geo. V. No. 2642))
Railways Audit Act 1906 (repealed)	6 Edw. VII. No. 2034	30 October 1906
An Act relating to the Audit of the Accounts of the Victorian Railways. (Repealed by Railway Lands Acquisition Act 1915 (6 Geo. V. No. 2715))
St. Kilda and Brighton Electric Street Railway Extension Act 1906 (repealed)	6 Edw. VII. No. 2035	30 October 1906
An Act to authorize the construction of a Line of Electric Railway in Brighton and for other purposes. (Repealed by Transport Act 1983 (No. 9921))
	6 Edw. VII. No. 2036	13 November 1906
An Act to apply out of the Consolidated Revenue the sum of Three hundred and seventy-nine thousand three hundred and forty-three pounds to the service of the year One thousand nine hundred and six and One thousand nine hundred and seven.
South Africa Contingents Pensions Act 1906 (repealed)	6 Edw. VII. No. 2037	20 November 1906
An Act to amend the South Africa Contingents Pensions Act 1905. (Note: South Africa Contingents Pensions Act 1905 (5 Edw. VII. No. 1997)) (Repealed by Statute Law Revision Act 1995 (No. 11 of 1995))
	6 Edw. VII. No. 2038	4 December 1906
An Act to apply out of the Consolidated Revenue the sum of Three hundred and sixty-one thousand and ninety-one pounds to the service of the year One thousand nine hundred and six and One thousand nine hundred and seven.
Companies Act 1906	6 Edw. VII. No. 2039	14 December 1906
An Act to further amend the Law relating to Companies.
Loan Acts Amendment Act 1906	6 Edw. VII. No. 2040	14 December 1906
An Act to authorize the Amendment of the First Schedule to the Treasury Bonds Act 1896 (Note: Treasury Bonds Act 1896 (60 Vict. No. 1451)) and the Schedule to the Victorian Government Three per cent. Stock Act 1899. (Note: Victorian Government Three Per Cent Stock Act 1899 (63 Vict. No. 1623))
Victorian Railway Loan Act 1906	6 Edw. VII. No. 2041	14 December 1906
An Act to authorize the raising of Money for Railways and other purposes.
Railway Loan Application Act 1906	6 Edw. VII. No. 2042	14 December 1906
An Act to sanction the issue and application of certain sums of Money available under Loan Acts for Railways.
Water Supply Loans Application Act 1906	6 Edw. VII. No. 2043	14 December 1906
An Act to sanction the issue and application of certain Sums of Money available under Loan Acts for Water Supply in Country Districts and for other purposes.
Trust Funds Act 1906	6 Edw. VII. No. 2044	14 December 1906
An Act to further amend the Trust Funds Act 1897. (Note: Trust Funds Act 1897 (61 Vict. No. 1531))
	6 Edw. VII. No. 2045	21 December 1906
An Act to apply a sum out of the Consolidated Revenue to the service of the year ending on the thirtieth day of June One thousand nine hundred and seven and to appropriate the Supplies granted in this Session of Parliament.
Crown Grants Act 1906 (repealed)	6 Edw. VII. No. 2046	28 December 1906
An Act authorizing the Governor in Council to regulate the custody of certain Crown Grants and for other purposes. (Repealed by Transfer of Land Act 1915 (6 Geo. V. No. 2740))
Public Meetings Act 1906 (repealed)	6 Edw. VII. No. 2047	28 December 1906
An Act for the prevention of Disorderly Conduct at Public Meetings. (Repealed by Police Offences Act 1912 (3 Geo. V. No. 2422))
Lifts Regulation Act 1906 (repealed)	6 Edw. VII. No. 2048	28 December 1906
An Act to regulate the use of Passenger and other Lifts. (Repealed by Lifts Regulation Act 1915 (6 Geo. V. No. 2684))
Maldon Rates Act 1906	6 Edw. VII. No. 2049	28 December 1906
An Act to enable the Council of the Shire of Maldon to Remit or Excuse the Payment of certain Rates and Interest.
Vegetation Diseases Act 1906 (repealed)	6 Edw. VII. No. 2050	28 December 1906
An Act to further amend the Vegetation Diseases Act 1896. (Note: Vegetation Diseases Act 1896 (59 Vict. No. 1432)) (Repealed by Vegetation and Vine Diseases Act 1915 (6 Geo. V. No. 2744))
Unclaimed Moneys Act 1906 (repealed)	6 Edw. VII. No. 2051	28 December 1906
An Act to provide for giving publicity to information relating to Unclaimed Funds and for other purposes. (Repealed by Companies Act 1915 (6 Geo. V. No. 2631))
Stock Diseases Act 1906	6 Edw. VII. No. 2052	28 December 1906
An Act to amend the Stock Diseases Act 1890. (Note: Stock Diseases Act 1890 (54 Vict. No. 1141))
Small Improved Holdings Act 1906 (repealed)	6 Edw. VII. No. 2053	28 December 1906
An Act to provide for Establishing and Controlling Small Improved Holdings of Land. (Repealed by Closer Settlement Act 1915 (6 Geo. V. No. 2629))
Waterworks Land Sales Act 1906 (repealed)	6 Edw. VII. No. 2054	28 December 1906
An Act to provide for the Sale of certain Surplus Lands acquired for Water Supply Purposes. (Repealed by Water Act 1915 (6 Geo. V. No. 2747))
Lotteries Gaming and Betting Act 1906 (repealed)	6 Edw. VII. No. 2055	28 December 1906
An Act to amend the Law relating to Lotteries Gaming and Betting and for other purposes. (Repealed by Police Offences Act 1912 (3 Geo. V. No. 2422))
Vacant Unclaimed Lands Act 1906 (repealed)	6 Edw. VII. No. 2056	28 December 1906
An Act to authorize the sale by the Governor in Council of vacant lands comprised in certain undelivered Crown Grants which have for over thirty years been unclaimed; and the disposal of the proceeds of such sale. (Repealed by Land Act 1915 (6 Geo. V. No. 2676))
South and East Melbourne Lands Act 1906	6 Edw. VII. No. 2057	28 December 1906
An Act to provide for the Sale of certain Crown Land in the City of South Melbourne to the Melbourne and Metropolitan Board of Works, and to authorize the said Board to sell certain land in the City of Melbourne to the incorporated institution called the Victorian Eye and Ear Hospital.
Children's Court Act 1906 (repealed)	6 Edw. VII. No. 2058	28 December 1906
An Act to establish and regulate Children's Courts. (Repealed by Children's Court Act 1915 (6 Geo. V. No. 2627))
Fruit Cases Act 1906 (repealed)	6 Edw. VII. No. 2059	28 December 1906
An Act to regulate the Sale or Export of Fruit in Fruit Cases. (Repealed by Fruit Act 1915 (6 Geo. V. No. 2657))
Consolidated Revenue Application Act 1906	6 Edw. VII. No. 2060	28 December 1906
An Act to authorize the Treasurer to pay to the Commissioners of Savings Banks and the Trust Funds Trustees certain moneys not later than the last day of July One thousand nine hundred and seven.
Money Lenders Act 1906 (repealed)	6 Edw. VII. No. 2061	28 December 1906
An Act to amend the Law with respect to Persons carrying on Business as Money Lenders. (Repealed by Money Lenders Act 1915 (6 Geo. V. No. 2701))
Marriage Act 1906 (repealed)	6 Edw. VII. No. 2062	28 December 1906
An Act to further amend the Marriage Act 1890. (Note: Marriage Act 1890 (54 Vict. No. 1166)) (Repealed by Marriage Act 1915 (6 Geo. V. No. 2691))
	6 Edw. VII. No. 2063	30 November 1904
An Act to further continue the Voting by Post Acts or one year. (Repealed by Constitution Act Amendment Act 1915 (6 Geo. V. No. 2632))
St. James' Church Land Act 1906	6 Edw. VII. No. 2064	28 December 1906
An Act to further alter the Trusts and Limitations in respect of portion of the Lands in the City of Melbourne generally known as St. James' Church Lands and for other purposes.
Kingower Land Act 1906	6 Edw. VII. No. 2065	28 December 1906
An Act to provide for the Exchange of certain Land formerly reserved for Race-course and Recreation purposes at Kingower for certain other Land.
William Burston Act 1906 (repealed)	6 Edw. VII. No. 2066	28 December 1906
An Act raising the Classification and increasing the Salary of William Burston, a Teacher in the Education Department. (Repealed by Public Service Act 1915 (6 Geo. V. No. 2713))
Closer Settlement Act 1906 (repealed)	6 Edw. VII. No. 2067	28 December 1906
An Act to amend the Closer Settlement Act 1904. (Note: Closer Settlement Act 1904 (4 Edw. VII. No. 1962)) (Repealed by Closer Settlement Act 1915 (6 Geo. V. No. 2629))
Licensing Act 1906 (repealed)	6 Edw. VII. No. 2068	28 December 1906
An Act to amend the Law relating to Licences for the Sale of Liquor and for other purposes. (Repealed by Licensing Act 1915 (6 Geo. V. No. 2683))
Medical Act 1906 (repealed)	6 Edw. VII. No. 2069	28 December 1906
An Act to amend the law relating to Medical Practitioners. (Repealed by Medical Act 1915 (6 Geo. V. No. 2695))
Friendly Societies Act 1906 (repealed)	6 Edw. VII. No. 2070	28 December 1906
An Act to amend the Friendly Societies Acts. (Repealed by Friendly Societies Act 1915 (6 Geo. V. No. 2656))
Boilers Inspection Act 1906 (repealed)	6 Edw. VII. No. 2071	28 December 1906
An Act to provide for the Inspection and Regulation of Boilers. (Repealed by Boilers Inspection Act 1915 (6 Geo. V. No. 2621))
Printers and Newspapers Act 1895 Amendment Act 1906 (repealed)	6 Edw. VII. No. 2072	28 December 1906
An Act to amend the Printers and Newspapers Act 1895 (Note: Printers and Newspapers Act 1895 (59 Vict. No. 1406)) and for other purposes. (Repealed by Printers and Newspapers Act 1915 (6 Geo. V. No. 2711))
Companies Act Amendment Act 1906	6 Edw. VII. No. 2073	28 December 1906
An Act to further amend the Companies Act 1896. (Note: Companies Act 1896 (60 Vict. No. 1482))
Widows and Young Children Maintenance Act 1906 (repealed)	6 Edw. VII. No. 2074	28 December 1906
An Act to provide for the Maintenance of the Widows and Young Children of Deceased Persons. (Repealed by Administration and Probate Act 1915 (6 Geo. V. No. 2611))

== Sources ==
- "1906 Victorian Historical Acts". AustLII.
