= List of acts of the Parliament of Victoria from 1936 =

This is a list of acts of the Parliament of Victoria, Australia for the year 1936.

== 1936 ==
Short title, or popular name	Citation	Royal assent
Long title
	No. 4362	2 July 1936
An Act to apply out of the Consolidated Revenue the sum of Two million four hundred and fifty-nine thousand two hundred and eighty-nine pounds to the service of the year One thousand nine hundred and thirty-six and One thousand nine hundred and thirty-seven.
Wodonga and Tallangatta Railway Deviation Act 1936 (repealed)	No. 4365	13 July 1936
An Act to vest a certain Deviation of the Wodonga and Tallangatta Railway and certain Lands upon which such Deviation is constructed in The Victorian Railways Commissioners and to vest an unused Portion of the said Railway and the Land upon which the same was constructed in the State Rivers and Water Supply Commission and for other purposes. (Repealed by Transport Act 1983 (No. 9921))
Warranook Railway (Dismantling) Act 1936 (repealed)	No. 4369	3 August 1936
An Act to provide for the Dismantling of the Warranook Railway and for other purposes. (Repealed by Transport Act 1983 (No. 9921))
	No. 4372	11 August 1936
An Act to apply out of the Consolidated Revenue the sum of Three hundred and forty-one thousand six hundred and eighty-two pounds to the service of the year One thousand nine hundred and thirty-five and One thousand nine hundred and thirty-six.
Agent-General's (Amendment) Act 1936	No. 4374	20 August 1936
An Act to amend Section Five of the Agent-General's Act 1928. (Note: Agent-General's Act 1928 (19 Geo. V. No. 3633))
	No. 4378	2 September 1936
An Act to apply out of the Consolidated Revenue the sum of Two million five hundred and twelve thousand five hundred and ninety-nine pounds to the service of the year One thousand nine hundred and thirty-six and One thousand nine hundred and thirty-seven.
Adoption of Children Act 1936	No. 4381	7 September 1936
An Act to amend the Law relating to the Adoption of Children.
Local Government (King George V. Memorials) Act 1936	No. 4388	21 September 1936
An Act to authorize Contributions by Municipalities towards Memorials in Commemoration of the Reign of His late Majesty King George V.
Unemployment Relief Loan and Application Act 1936 (repealed)	No. 4394	5 October 1936
An Act to amend Section Three of the Unemployment Relief Loan and Application Act 1932. (Note: Unemployment Relief Loan and Application Act 1932 (No. 4097)) (Repealed by Treasury Legislation (Repeal) Act 2005 (No. 73 of 2005))
Great Ocean Road Lands Act 1936 (repealed)	No. 4395	5 October 1936
An Act to ratify validate and approve an Agreement between the Treasurer of Victoria and the Great Ocean Road Trust Proprietary Limited, and for other purposes. (Repealed by Statute Law Revision Act 1984 (No. 10087))
Hairdressers Registration Act 1936	No. 4396	12 October 1936
An Act to provide for the Registration of Hairdressers and for other purposes.
Administration and Probate Duties Act 1936	No. 4403	19 October 1936
An Act to continue the operation of Part III. of the Finance Act 1930. (Note: Finance Act 1930 (No. 3889))
Constitution Act Amendment Act 1936	No. 4409	29 October 1936
An Act to make Provision for the Redivision of the State of Victoria into Electoral Provinces for the Legislative Council and Preferential Voting at General Elections for the Legislative Council, and for other purposes.
	No. 4417	5 November 1936
An Act to apply out of the Consolidated Revenue the sum of Two million seven hundred and six thousand four hundred and fifty-nine pounds to the service of the year One thousand nine hundred and thirty-six and One thousand nine hundred and thirty-seven.
Auction Sales Act 1936	No. 4420	16 November 1936
An Act to amend the Auction Sales Act 1935. (Note: Auction Sales Act 1935 (No. 4323))
Dried Fruits Act 1936 (repealed)	No. 4424	23 November 1936
An Act relating to the Constitution of the Victorian Dried Fruits Board. (Repealed by Dried Fruits Act 1938 (No. 4594))
Zoological Gardens Act 1936	No. 4431	14 December 1936
An Act relating to the Administration and Control of the Zoological Gardens and for other purposes.
Miners' Phthisis Relief Act 1936 (repealed)	No. 4438	21 December 1936
An Act to make provision for the Relief of Persons suffering from Miners' Phthisis and for other purposes. (Repealed by Treasury Legislation (Repeal) Act 2005 (No. 73 of 2005))
Anti-Cancer Council Act 1936	No. 4446	23 December 1936
An Act to make provision with respect to the Incorporation of an Anti-Cancer Council of Victoria and the Objects and Powers thereof and for other purposes.
Dried Fruits (Amendment) Act 1936 (repealed)	No. 4448	23 December 1936
An Act to incorporate the Victorian Dried Fruits Board and to empower the said Board to enter into certain Agreements. (Repealed by Dried Fruits Act 1938 (No. 4594))
Apprenticeship Act 1936	No. 4453	23 December 1936
An Act to amend the Law relating to Apprenticeship.
Unemployment Relief (Administration) Act 1936 (repealed)	No. 4455	23 December 1936
An Act to amend Section Twenty-three of the Unemployment Relief (Administration) Act 1932. (Note: Unemployment Relief (Administration) Act 1932 (No. 4079)) (Repealed by Treasury Legislation (Repeal) Act 2005 (No. 73 of 2005))
Public Service (Transfer of Officers) Act 1936 (repealed)	No. 4462	23 December 1936
An Act to provide for the Transfer to the Public Service of certain Railway Officers and for other purposes. (Repealed by Public Service Act 1946 (No. 5124))
	No. 4465	23 December 1936
An Act to apply a sum out of the Consolidated Revenue to the service of the year ending on the thirtieth day of June One thousand nine hundred and thirty-seven and to appropriate the Supplies granted in this Session of Parliament.
Box Hill Land Act 1936	No.	
Cattle Compensation Act 1936	No.	
Coal Mines Regulation Act 1936	No.	
Country Roads (Borrowing) Act 1936	No.	
Country Roads (Tourists' Roads) Act 1936	No.	
Country Roads Act 1936	No.	
Country Roads Board Fund (Amendment) Act 1936	No.	
Country Roads Board Fund Act 1936	No.	
Dairy Products Act 1936	No.	
Dog Act 1936	No.	
Electric Light and Power Act 1936	No.	
Factories and Shops Act 1936	No.	
Federal Aid Roads Act 1936	No.	
Fertillizers Act 1936	No.	
Financial Emergency (Grants and Funds) Act 1936	No.	
Financial Emergency (Mortgages) Continuation Act 1936	No.	
Footscray Land Act 1936	No.	
Forests (Exchange of Lands) Act 1936	No.	
Fruit and Vegetables Act 1936	No.	
Geelong Lands Act 1936	No.	
Gold Buyers Act 1936	No.	
Goods (Sale of Wool) Act 1936	No.	
Grain Elevators (Financial) Act 1936	No.	
Health (Margarine) Act 1936	No.	
Hire-Purchase Agreements Act 1936	No.	
Hospitals and Charities Act 1936	No.	
Income Tax (Assessment) Act 1936	No.	
Income Tax (Rates) Act 1936	No.	
Income Tax (Rates) Amendment Act 1936	No.	
Income Tax Acts Amendment Act 1936	No.	
Instruments (Insurance Contracts) Act 1936	No.	
Instruments Act 1936	No.	
Land (Crown Leases Adjustment) Act 1936	No.	
Land Tax Act 1936	No.	
Landlord and Tenant (Rent Reduction) Continuation Act 1936	No.	
Legal Profession Practice Act 1936	No.	
Local Government (Temporary Reduction of Interest) Act 1936	No.	
Local Government Act 1936	No.	
Marriage Act 1936	No.	
Melbourne and Metropolitan Tramways (Port Melbourne Land) Act 1936	No.	
Melbourne Harbor Trust Act 1936	No.	
Mepunga Lands Exchange Act 1936	No.	
Mildura Irrigation Trust (Drainage) Act 1936	No.	
Milk Board Act 1936	No.	
Newmarket Sheep Sales (Continuation) Act 1936	No.	
Nurses Act 1936	No.	
Police Offences (Race-meetings) Act 1936	No.	
Police Offences (Street Betting) Act 1936	No.	
Police Offences (Trotting Races) Act 1936	No.	
Public Works (Mental Hygiene) Loan Application Act 1936	No.	
Public Works Loan Application Act 1936	No.	
Railway Loan Application Act 1936	No.	
Railways (Finances Adjustment) Act 1936	No.	
Railways and Tramways (Contributions) Act 1936	No.	
Responsible Ministers of the Crown Act 1936	No.	
Second-hand Dealers Act 1936	No.	
Sewerage Districts (Temporary Reduction of Interest) Act 1936	No.	
South Melbourne and Port Melbourne Land Act 1936	No.	
Stamps (Annual Licences) Act 1936	No.	
Stamps (Increased Duty Continuance) Act 1936	No.	
State Electricity Commission (Chelsea Purchase) Act 1936	No.	
State Electricity Commission Act 1936	No.	
State Forests Loan Application Act 1936	No.	
Stock Foods Act 1936	No.	
Superannuation (Retirement) Act 1936	No.	
Supreme Court (Judges Retirement) Act 1936	No.	
Teachers Act 1936	No.	
Treasury Bonds Act 1936	No.	
Trustee Act 1936	No.	
Unemployment Relief Fund Act 1936	No.	
Unemployment Relief Tax (Rates) Act 1936	No.	
Unemployment Relief Tax Act 1936	No.	
Unemployment Relief Tax Amendment Act 1936	No.	
Victorian Loan Act 1936	No.	
Water Act 1936	No.	
Water Supply Loans Application Act 1936	No.	
Wheat Growers Relief (Commonwealth Payment) Act 1936	No.	
Wood Pulp Agreement Act 1936	No.	
Workers' Compensation Act 1936	No.	
Wrongs Act 1936	No.	

== Sources ==
- "1936 Victorian Historical Acts". AustLII.
