= List of acts of the Parliament of Victoria from 1905 =

This is a list of acts of the Parliament of Victoria, Australia for the year 1905.

== 1905 ==
Short title, or popular name	Citation	Royal assent
Long title
	5 Edw. VII. No. 1963	18 July 1905
An Act to apply out of the Consolidated Revenue the sum of One million two hundred and ninety-eight thousand seven hundred and fifty-four pounds to the service of the year One thousand nine hundred and five and One thousand nine hundred and six.
	5 Edw. VII. No. 1964	1 August 1905
An Act to apply out of the Consolidated Revenue the sum of Fifty-nine thousand four hundred and eighty-one pounds to the service of the year One thousand nine hundred and four and One thousand nine hundred and five.
Marine Act 1905 (repealed)	5 Edw. VII. No. 1965	15 August 1905
An Act relating to the Licensing of Boats Let out for Hire. (Repealed by Marine Act 1915 (6 Geo. V. No. 2688))
Registration of Deeds Act 1905 (repealed)	5 Edw. VII. No. 1966	24 August 1905
An Act relating to the Registration of Deeds Conveyances and other Instruments. (Repealed by Real Property Act 1915 (6 Geo. V. No. 2719))
Friendly Societies Act 1905 (repealed)	5 Edw. VII. No. 1967	29 August 1905
An Act to provide for the Restriction of Transfer of Bonds and Debentures held by the Trustees of Friendly Societies or Branches of Friendly Societies. (Repealed by Friendly Societies Act 1915 (6 Geo. V. No. 2656))
Metropolitan Fire Brigades Board Loan Act 1905	5 Edw. VII. No. 1968	29 August 1905
An Act to authorize the Metropolitan Fire Brigades Board to Borrow a further sum of Thirty thousand pounds and for other purposes.
Surplus Revenue Act 1905	5 Edw. VII. No. 1969	30 August 1905
An Act relating to the Surplus Revenue of the Financial Year, ended on the thirtieth, day of June One thousand nine hundred and five, and to amend the Surplus Revenue Acts No. 1904 (Note: Surplus Revenue Act 1904 (4 Edw. VII. No. 1904)) and No. 1945. (Note: Surplus Revenue Act 1904 (No. 2) (4 Edw. VII. No. 1945))
Probate Charges Act 1905 (repealed)	5 Edw. VII. No. 1970	12 September 1905
An Act to amend the Probate Charges Act 1903. (Note: Probate Charges Act 1903 (3 Edw. VII. No. 1827)) (Repealed by Administration and Probate Act 1915 (6 Geo. V. No. 2611))
Malvern Loan Act 1905	5 Edw. VII. No. 1971	12 September 1905
An Act to authorize the Town of Malvern to construct and provide certain Permanent Works and Undertakings in lieu of certain other remanent Works and Undertakings.
Municipal Grounds Act 1905 (repealed)	5 Edw. VII. No. 1972	12 September 1905
An Act relating to Municipal Pleasure Grounds and amending Section Fifty-three of the Local Government Act 1903. (Note: Local Government Act 1903 (3 Edw. VII. No. 1893)) (Repealed by Local Government Act 1915 (6 Geo. V. No. 2686))
St. Kilda and Brighton Electric Street Railway Extension Act 1905 (repealed)	5 Edw. VII. No. 1973	26 September 1905
An Act to authorize the construction of a Line of Electric Railway in St. Kilda and for other purposes. (Repealed by Transport Act 1983 (No. 9921))
Secret Commissions Prohibition Act 1905 (repealed)	5 Edw. VII. No. 1974	6 October 1905
An Act for the Prohibition of Secret Commissions. (Repealed by Crimes Act 1915 (6 Geo. V. No. 2637))
Factories and Shops Act 1905 (repealed)	5 Edw. VII. No. 1975	6 October 1905
An Act to consolidate the Law relating to the Supervision and Regulation of Factories Workrooms and Shops and for other purposes. (Repealed by Factories and Shops Act 1912 (3 Geo. V. No. 2386))
Artificial Manures Act 1905	5 Edw. VII. No. 1976	10 October 1905
An Act to amend the Artificial Manures Act 1904. (Note: Artificial Manures Act 1904 (4 Edw. VII. No. 1930))
Agricultural Colleges Act 1905 (repealed)	5 Edw. VII. No. 1977	23 October 1905
An Act to further amend the Agricultural Colleges Act 1890. (Note: Agricultural Colleges Act 1890 (54 Vict. No. 1062)) (Repealed by Agricultural Colleges Act 1915 (6 Geo. V. No. 2613))
	5 Edw. VII. No. 1978	23 October 1905
An Act to apply out of the Consolidated Revenue the sum of Seven hundred and live thousand one hundred and thirty-nine pounds to the service of the year One thousand nine hundred and five and One thousand nine hundred and six.
Audit Act 1905 (repealed)	5 Edw. VII. No. 1979	22 November 1905
An Act to further amend the Audit Act 1890. (Note: Audit Act 1890 (54 Vict. No. 1066)) (Repealed by Audit Act 1915 (6 Geo. V. No. 2516))
Municipal Endowment Reduction Act 1905	5 Edw. VII. No. 1980	22 November 1905
An Act to reduce for One Year the Municipal Endowment.
Dairying Companies Act 1905 (repealed)	5 Edw. VII. No. 1981	22 November 1905
An Act to amend the Companies Acts so far as regards Dairying Companies. (Repealed by Companies Act 1915 (6 Geo. V. No. 2631))
Treasury Bonds Act 1905	5 Edw. VII. No. 1982	22 November 1905
An Act to provide for the Issuing of Treasury Bonds when required for paying off repurchasing or redeeming Government securities or for exchanging therefor.
Victorian Railways Motor Act 1905 (repealed)	5 Edw. VII. No. 1983	22 November 1905
An Act to enable the Victorian Railways Commissioners to construct acquire maintain and use Motor Carriages or Cars for passenger traffic. (Repealed by Railway Lands Acquisition Act 1915 (6 Geo. V. No. 2715))
Administration and Probate Duties Act 1905 (repealed)	5 Edw. VII. No. 1984	22 November 1905
An Act relating to Duties payable under the Administration and Probate Acts. (Repealed by Administration and Probate Act 1915 (6 Geo. V. No. 2611))
Income Tax Act 1905 (repealed)	5 Edw. VII. No. 1985	22 November 1905
An Act to declare the Rates of Income Tax for the Year ending on the thirty-first day of December One thousand nine hundred and six. (Repealed by Income Tax Act 1915 (6 Geo. V. No. 2668))
Poisons Act 1905 (repealed)	5 Edw. VII. No. 1986	22 November 1905
An Act to further amend the Poisons Act 1890. (Note: Poisons Act 1890 (54 Vict. No. 1125)) (Repealed by Poisons Act 1915 (6 Geo. V. No. 2707))
Friendly Societies' Gardens Act 1905	5 Edw. VII. No. 1987	22 November 1905
An Act to authorize the revesting in the Crown of certain Lands in the City of Melbourne now held under Certificate of Title by Trustees as a Recreation Ground for and in connexion with the Friendly Societies of Victoria and also the cancellation of the Crown Grant and Certificate and for other purposes.
	5 Edw. VII. No. 1988	5 December 1905
An Act to provide a Superannuation Allowance to Paul Anthony McAnulty.
Melbourne and Geelong Married Women's Municipal Franchise Act 1905	5 Edw. VII. No. 1989	5 December 1905
An Act respecting Toting by Married Women at Municipal Elections in the City of Melbourne and the Town of Geelong.
Treasury Bonds Conversion Act 1905	5 Edw. VII. No. 1990	5 December 1905
An Act to authorize the raising of Money for the redemption or payment of certain Treasury Bonds and for other purposes.
Land Act 1905 (repealed)	5 Edw. VII. No. 1991	5 December 1905
An Act to amend the Land Acts. (Repealed by Land Act 1915 (6 Geo. V. No. 2676))
Water Supply Loans Application Act 1905	5 Edw. VII. No. 1992	5 December 1905
An Act to sanction the issue and application of certain Sums of Money available under Loan Acts for Water Supply in Country Districts and for other purposes.
	5 Edw. VII. No. 1993	30 November 1904
An Act to further continue the Voting by Post Acts or one year. (Repealed by Constitution Act Amendment Act 1915 (6 Geo. V. No. 2632))
Carrum Drainage Works Act 1905	5 Edw. VII. No. 1994	12 December 1905
An Act relating to the Carrum Irrigation and Water Supply Trust District.
Oakleigh Mechanics' Institute Act 1905	5 Edw. VII. No. 1995	12 December 1905
An Act to enable the Trustees of the Oakleigh Mechanics' Institute and Free Library Land to borrow Money for the purposes of the Trust.
Victorian Stock and Debentures Conversion Act 1905 (repealed)	5 Edw. VII. No. 1996	12 December 1905
An Act to give further facilities to the holders of Victorian Government Stock or Debentures and for converting Government Debentures into Victorian Government Stock or other Debentures. (Repealed by Treasury Legislation (Repeal) Act 2005 (No. 73 of 2005))
South Africa Contingents Pensions Act 1905 (repealed)	5 Edw. VII. No. 1997	12 December 1905
An Act to provide Pensions to certain Members of Victorian Contingents after active military service in South Africa and also to certain relatives of deceased members. (Repealed by Statute Law Revision Act 1995 (No. 11 of 1995))
Surplus Revenue Act 1905 (No. 2)	5 Edw. VII. No. 1998	12 December 1905
An Act relating to the Surplus Revenue of the Financial Year ended on the thirtieth day of June One thousand nine hundred and five and other Moneys.
Railway Loan Application Act 1905	5 Edw. VII. No. 1999	12 December 1905
An Act to sanction the issue and application of certain Money available under Loan Acts for Railways and for other purposes.
Eaglehawk Land Act 1905	5 Edw. VII. No. 2000	12 December 1905
An Act to revoke the Permanent Reservation and Crown Grant of portion of the Site for Reservoir Stormwater Channel and Public Park at Eaglehawk and for other purposes.
Stock and Debentures Registers Act 1905	5 Edw. VII. No. 2001	12 December 1905
An Act to provide for the transfer of Victorian Government Inscribed Stock or Consolidated Inscribed Stock or Debentures from London Registers to Melbourne Registers.
Drainage Areas Act 1905 (repealed)	5 Edw. VII. No. 2002	12 December 1905
An Act to amend the Drainage Areas Act 1898. (Note: Drainage Areas Act 1898 (62 Vict. No. 1583)) (Repealed by Drainage Areas Act 1915 (6 Geo. V. No. 2642))
Opium Smoking Prohibition Act 1905 (repealed)	5 Edw. VII. No. 2003	12 December 1905
An Act to prohibit the Smoking of Opium and for other purposes. (Repealed by Poisons Act 1915 (6 Geo. V. No. 2707))
South Melbourne Land Act 1905 (repealed)	5 Edw. VII. No. 2004	12 December 1905
An Act to authorize the Sale of certain Crown Land to the City of South Melbourne. (Repealed by 6 Edw. VII. No. 2024)
Education Act 1905 (repealed)	5 Edw. VII. No. 2005	12 December 1905
An Act to amend the Education Act 1901. (Note: Education Act 1901 (1 Edw. VII. No. 1777)) (Repealed by Education Act 1915 (6 Geo. V. No. 2644))
Teachers Act 1905 (repealed)	5 Edw. VII. No. 2006	12 December 1905
An Act to amend the Law relating to State School Teachers. (Repealed by Public Service Act 1915 (6 Geo. V. No. 2713))
Melbourne and Metropolitan Board of Works Act 1905 (repealed)	5 Edw. VII. No. 2007	12 December 1905
An Act to amend the Melbourne and Metropolitan Board of Works Acts. (Repealed by Melbourne and Metropolitan Board of Works Act 1915 (6 Geo. V. No. 2696))
Factories and Shops Act 1905 (No. 2) (repealed)	5 Edw. VII. No. 2008	12 December 1905
An Act to amend the Factories and Shops Act 1905. (Note: Factories and Shops Act 1905 (5 Edw. VII. No. 1975)) (Repealed by Factories and Shops Act 1912 (3 Geo. V. No. 2386))
Agricultural Colleges Act 1905 (No. 2) (repealed)	5 Edw. VII. No. 2009	12 December 1905
An Act to further amend the Agricultural Colleges Act 1890. (Repealed by Agricultural Colleges Act 1915 (6 Geo. V. No. 2613))
Pure Food Act 1905 (repealed)	5 Edw. VII. No. 2010	12 December 1905
An Act for the prevention of the Adulteration of Food and for other purposes. (Repealed by Health Act 1915 (6 Geo. V. No. 2665))
Milk and Dairy Supervision Act 1905 (repealed)	5 Edw. VII. No. 2011	12 December 1905
An Act to regulate the Production and Sale of Milk and Dairy Produce and for other purposes. (Repealed by Dairy Supervision Act 1915 (6 Geo. V. No. 2639))
Geelong Harbor Trust Act 1905	5 Edw. VII. No. 2012	12 December 1905
An Act to provide for the Construction of Works in connexion with the Harbor at Geelong.
Registration of Teachers and Schools Act 1905 (repealed)	5 Edw. VII. No. 2013	12 December 1905
An Act to provide for the Registration of Teachers and Schools. (Repealed by Education Act 1915 (6 Geo. V. No. 2644))
	5 Edw. VII. No. 2014	12 December 1905
An Act to apply a sum out of the Consolidated Revenue to the service of the year ending on the thirtieth day of June One thousand nine hundred and six and to appropriate the Supplies granted in this Session of Parliament.
Talbot Colony for Epileptics Act 1905	5 Edw. VII. No. 2015	12 December 1905
An Act to provide for the Incorporation and Government of The Talbot Colony for Epileptics and for other purposes.
Water Act 1905 (repealed)	5 Edw. VII. No. 2016	12 December 1905
An Act to consolidate and amend the Laws relating to the Conservation and Supply of Water to declare the Law relating' to certain Rights in Natural Waters the properly in the beds and banks containing the same and for other purposes. (Repealed by Water Act 1905 (5 Edw. VII. No. 2016))

== Sources ==
- "1905 Victorian Historical Acts". AustLII.
