= List of acts of the Parliament of Victoria from 1955 =

This is a list of acts of the Parliament of Victoria, Australia for the year 1955.

== 1955 ==
Short title, or popular name	Citation	Royal assent
Long title
	No. 5854	21 June 1955
An Act to apply out of the Consolidated Revenue the sum of Twenty-two million three hundred and thirty-six thousand eight hundred pounds to the service of the year One thousand nine hundred and fifty-five and One thousand nine hundred and fifty-six.
Statute Law Revision Committee (Amendment) Act 1955	No. 5855	20 September 1955
An Act to amend Section Four of the Statute Law Revision Committee Act 1948. (Note: Statute Law Revision Committee Act 1948 (No. 5285))
	No. 5856	27 September 1955
An Act to apply out of the Consolidated Revenue the sum of Three million three hundred and forty-one thousand nine hundred and ninety-five pounds to the service of the year One thousand nine hundred and fifty-four and One thousand nine hundred and fifty-five.
Auditor-General's Salary Act 1955	No. 5857	27 September 1955
An Act relating to the Salary of the Auditor-General.
	No. 5858	27 September 1955
An Act to apply out of the Consolidated Revenue the sum of Twenty-three million three hundred and fifteen thousand five hundred and forty-six pounds to the service of the year One thousand nine hundred and fifty-five and One thousand nine hundred and fifty-six.
	No. 5940	13 December 1955
An Act to apply a sum out of the Consolidated Revenue to the service of the year ending on the thirtieth day of June One thousand nine hundred and fifty-six and to appropriate the Supplies granted in this Session of Parliament.
Newport "A" Power Station Act 1955	No. 5864	18 October 1955
An Act to make further provision with respect to the Transfer of the Newport "A" Power Station to the State Electricity Commission of Victoria.
Adoption of Children Act 1955	No. 5865	18 October 1955
An Act relating to the Adoption of Children.
Railway Deviations Act 1955 (repealed)	No. 5872	25 October 1955
An Act to Authorize the Construction of Deviations on the Castlemaine and Dunolly Railway, the Yea and Mansfield Railway, the Wodonga and Tallangatta Railway and the Tallangatta and Cudgewa Railway, and for other purposes. (Repealed by Transport Act 1983 (No. 9921))
Wonthaggi Railway Land Act 1955 (repealed)	No. 5891	22 November 1955
An Act to authorize the Grant of certain Land at Wonthaggi to The Victorian Railways Commissioners and the subsequent Disposal of such Land, and for other purposes. (Repealed by Transport Act 1983 (No. 9921))
Administration and Probate (Estates) Act 1955	No. 5895	29 November 1955
An Act relating to Duties on Deceased Persons' Estates and to amend the Administration and Probate (Estates) Acts.
Statute Law Revision Act 1955	No. 5896	29 November 1955
An Act to revise the Statute Law and for other purposes.
Old Colonists' Association Act 1955	No. 5901	29 November 1955
An Act relating to The Old Colonists' Association of Victoria.
Olympic Games Act 1955 (repealed)	No. 5905	29 November 1955
An Act to facilitate the holding of the Olympic Games to be held in the Year One thousand nine hundred and fifty-six, and for other purposes. (Repealed by Statute Law Revision Act 1995 (No. 11 of 1995))
Public Works Loan Application Act 1955 (repealed)	No. 5921	13 December 1955
An Act to sanction the Issue and Application of Loan Money for Public Works and other Purposes. (Repealed by Treasury Legislation (Repeal) Act 2005 (No. 73 of 2005))
Public Officers Salaries Act 1955 (repealed)	No. 5933	13 December 1955
An Act relating to the Salaries of certain Public Officers. (Repealed by Statute Law Revision Act 1995 (No. 11 of 1995))
Railways Dismantling Act 1955 (repealed)	No. 5939	13 December 1955
An Act to make Provision with respect to the Dismantling of certain Railways and Sections of Railways, and for other purposes. (Repealed by Transport Act 1983 (No. 9921))
Bailiffs Act 1955	No.	
Benefit Associations (Amendment) Act 1955	No.	
Children's Welfare (Amendment) Act 1955	No.	
Co-operative Housing Societies (Amendment) Act 1955	No.	
Coal Mine Workers Pensions (Amendment) Act 1955	No.	
Commercial Goods Vehicles Act 1955	No.	
Companies (Names) Act 1955	No.	
Companies Act 1955	No.	
Country Fire Authority (Financial) Act 1955	No.	
Crimes (Amendment) Act 1955	No.	
Crimes (Driving Offences) Act 1955	No.	
Crown Proceedings Act 1955	No.	
Dairy Produce (Cheese) Act 1955	No.	
Dietitians Registration (Amendment) Act 1955	No.	
Dog Races Act 1955	No.	
Evidence (Amendment) Act 1955	No.	
Firearms (Olympic Games) Act 1955	No.	
Fisheries (Proclamation) Act 1955	No.	
Forests (Amendment) Act 1955	No.	
Friendly Societies (Amendment) Act 1955	No.	
Gas and Fuel Corporation (Financial) Act 1955	No.	
Geelong Harbor Trust (Amendment) Act 1955	No.	
Geelong Market Site Act 1955	No.	
Geelong Waterworks and Sewerage (Amendment) Act 1955	No.	
Health (Offensive Trades) Act 1955	No.	
Hide and Leather Industries (Repeal) Act 1955	No.	
Home Finance Act 1955	No.	
Housing Act 1955	No.	
Justices (Amendment) Act 1955	No.	
Labour and Industry (Long Service Leave) Act 1955	No.	
Labour and Industry (Shops) Act 1955	No.	
Land Tax (Exemptions and Rates) Act 1955	No.	
Landlord and Tenant (Amendment) Act 1955	No.	
Lang Lang Land Act 1955	No.	
Legal Profession Practice (Amendment) Act 1955	No.	
Licensing (Amendment) Act 1955	No.	
Licensing Act 1955	No.	
Limitation of Actions Act 1955	No.	
Local Government (Amendment) Act 1955	No.	
Maintenance (Enforcement of Orders) Act 1955	No.	
Marine (Temporary Exemptions) Act 1955	No.	
Medical (Pharmacy Board Fees) Act 1955	No.	
Melbourne Market and Park Lands Act 1955	No.	
Mental Hygiene (Amendment) Act 1955	No.	
Milk Board (Amendment) Act 1955	No.	
Mines (Petroleum) Act 1955	No.	
Mines (Uranium and Thorium) Act 1955	No.	
Motor Car (Amendment) Act 1955	No.	
Motor Car (Road Safety) Act 1955	No.	
Parking of Vehicles (Amendment) Act 1955	No.	
Parliamentary Elections (State Servants) Amendment Act 1955	No.	
Police Offences (Valueless Cheques) Act 1955	No.	
Police Regulation (Junior Trainees) Act 1955	No.	
Police Regulation (Pensions) Act 1955	No.	
Property Law and Transfer of Land Act 1955	No.	
Public Service (Amendment) Act 1955	No.	
Railway Loan Application Act 1955	No.	
Railways (Amendment) Act 1955	No.	
Revocation and Excision of Crown Reservations Act 1955	No.	
Soldier Settlement (Amendment) Act 1955	No.	
State Forests Loan Application Act 1955	No.	
State Savings Bank (Amendment) Act 1955	No.	
Stock Medicines (Amendment) Act 1955	No.	
Superannuation Act 1955	No.	
Supreme Court (Officers) Act 1955	No.	
Supreme Court and County Court (Judges) Act 1955	No.	
Surplus Revenue Act 1955	No.	
Teaching Service (Amendment) Act 1955	No.	
Transport Regulation Act 1955	No.	
Water Supply Loan Application Act 1955	No.	

== Sources ==
- "1955 Victorian Historical Acts". AustLII.
