= List of acts of the Parliament of Victoria from 1941 =

This is a list of acts of the Parliament of Victoria, Australia for the year 1941.

== 1941 ==
Short title, or popular name	Citation	Royal assent
Long title
	No. 4798	30 June 1941
An Act to apply out of the Consolidated Revenue the sum of Two million nine hundred and forty-six thousand six hundred and seven pounds to the service of the year One thousand nine hundred and forty-one and One thousand nine hundred and forty-two.
University (Funds) Act 1941	No. 4800	28 July 1941
An Act relating to Trust Funds and other Funds of The University of Melbourne.
Nowingi to Millewa South Railway (Partial Dismantling) Act 1941 (repealed)	No. 4801	28 July 1941
An Act to provide for the Dismantling of a Section of the Constructed Portion of Nowingi to Millewa South Railway, and for other purposes. (Repealed by Transport Act 1983 (No. 9921))
	No. 4807	12 August 1941
An Act to apply out of the Consolidated Revenue the sum of Five hundred and sixty-nine thousand and sixty-four pounds to the service of the year One thousand nine hundred and forty and One thousand nine hundred and forty-one.
	No. 4808	12 August 1941
An Act to apply out of the Consolidated Revenue the sum of One million four hundred and eighty-two thousand one hundred and thirty-two pounds to the service of the year One thousand nine hundred and forty-one and One thousand nine hundred and forty-two.
National Security (Emergency Powers) Continuation Act 1941 (repealed)	No. 4812	12 August 1941
An Act to continue the Operation of the National Security (Emergency Powers) Act 1939. (Note: National Security (Emergency Powers) Act 1939 (No. 4645)) (Repealed by National Security (Repeal) Act 1945 (No. 5073))
Churches of Christ in Victoria Property Act 1941	No. 4818	30 September 1941
An Act to incorporate by the Name of The Properties Corporation of the Churches of Christ the Trustees of certain Properties of the Churches of Christ in Victoria and to vest certain of the Properties of the said Churches in Victoria in such Corporation, and for other purposes.
	No. 4820	7 October 1941
An Act to apply out of the Consolidated Revenue the sum of Two million nine hundred and sixty-seven thousand two hundred and forty-five pounds to the service of the year One thousand nine hundred and forty-one and One thousand nine hundred and forty-two.
Lal Lal Racecourse Railway (Dismantling) Act 1941 (repealed)	No. 4822	21 October 1941
An Act to provide for the Dismantling of the Lal Lal Racecourse Railway, and for other purposes. (Repealed by Transport Act 1983 (No. 9921))
Administration and Probate Duties Act 1941	No. 4828	21 October 1941
An Act to continue the operation of Part III. of the Finance Act 1930. (Note: Finance Act 1930 (No. 3889))
Neerim South to Toorongo River Railway Act 1941	No. 4831	28 October 1941
An Act relating to the Neerim South to Toorongo River Railway.
Statute Law Revision Act 1941	No. 4840	26 November 1941
An Act to revise the Statute Law and for other purposes.
	No. 4842	2 December 1941
An Act to apply out of the Consolidated Revenue the sum of One million five hundred and fifty-four thousand and ninety-six pounds to the service of the year One thousand nine hundred and forty-one and One thousand nine hundred and forty-two.
Kew and Heidelberg Lands (Amendment) Act 1941 (repealed)	No. 4843	2 December 1941
An Act to increase the Amount of certain Moneys paid annually by the Councils respectively of the Cities of Kew, Heidelberg and Collingwood to the Trustees of certain Lands described in the Ninth Schedule to the Kew and Heidelberg Lands Act 1933, (Note: Kew and Heidelberg Lands Act 1933 (No. 4194)) and for other purposes. (Repealed by Statute Law Revision Act 1984 (No. 10087))
Stamps (Amendment) Act 1941	No. 4847	2 December 1941
An Act to amend Section Seventy-four of and the Third Schedule to the Stamps Act 1928. (Note: Stamps Act 1928 (19 Geo. V. No. 3775))
Voting By Post (Armed Services) Act 1941	No. 4849	2 December 1941
An Act relating to Voting by Post at Parliamentary Elections.
War-time (Company) Tax Collection Act 1941	No. 4857	9 December 1941
An Act relating to the Collection by the State of Commonwealth War-time (Company) Tax payable in Victoria.
Kerang and Koondrook Tramway (Liability) Act 1941	No. 4861	9 December 1941
An Act to relieve the Council of the Shire of Kerang of Liabilities to the Treasurer of Victoria under the Kerang and Koondrook Tramway Acts.
Church of England (Ballarat East) Land Act 1941	No. 4864	11 December 1941
An Act to make Provision with respect to Trusts upon which certain Land at Ballarat East is held by The Ballarat Diocesan Trustees and with respect to the Sale or other Disposition of such Land and the Application of the Proceeds thereof, and for other purposes.
University (Funds) Amendment Act 1941	No. 4866	11 December 1941
An Act to extend the Provisions of the University (Funds) Act 1941 (Note: University (Funds) Act 1941 (No. 4800)) to the Residential Colleges affiliated with the University of Melbourne.
Liquid Fuel Act 1941 (repealed)	No. 4871	16 December 1941
An Act to provide for the Regulation of the Sale of Motor Spirit and Liquid Fuel and for purposes connected therewith. (Repealed by Dangerous Goods Act 1985 (No. 10189))
	No. 4879	16 December 1941
An Act to apply a sum out of the Consolidated Revenue to the service of the year ending on the thirtieth day of June One thousand nine hundred and forty-two and to appropriate the Supplies granted in this Session of Parliament.
Coal Mines Regulation Act 1941	No.	
Country Roads Board Fund Act 1941	No.	
Crown Reservations (Excisions) Act 1941	No.	
Dog Act 1941	No.	
Education Act 1941	No.	
Evidence Act 1941	No.	
Factories and Shops (Garages) Act 1941	No.	
Factories and Shops Act 1941	No.	
Farmers Debts Adjustment (Board) Act 1941	No.	
Farmers Protection Act 1914	No.	
Financial Emergency (Grants and Funds) Act 1941	No.	
Freezing Works (Overdraft Guarantee) Act 1941	No.	
Goods (Amendment) Act 1941	No.	
Health Act 1941	No.	
Hospitals and Charities Act 1941	No.	
Imprisonment of Fraudulent Debtors (Amendment) Act 1941	No.	
Income Tax (Assessment) Act 1941	No.	
Income Tax (Rates) Act 1941	No.	
Land Act 1941	No.	
Land Tax Act 1941	No.	
Local Government (Frankston Street Construction) Act 1941	No.	
Local Government (Secrecy of the Ballot) Act 1941	No.	
Local Government (Septic Tanks) Act 1941	No.	
Local Government Act 1941	No.	
Lunacy Act 1941	No.	
Maintenance (Widowed Mothers) Act 1941	No.	
Marriage Act 1941	No.	
Medical (Pharmaceutical Chemists) Act 1941	No.	
Melbourne (Subways) Act 1941	No.	
Melbourne and Metropolitan Tramways (Inscribed Stock) Act 1941	No.	
Melbourne Lands Exchange Act 1941	No.	
Mildura Irrigation and Water Trusts (Land) Act 1941	No.	
Miners' Phthisis (Treasury Allowances) Amendment Act 1941	No.	
Money Lenders Act 1941	No.	
Motor Car (Fees) Act 1941	No.	
Motor Car (Regulations) Act 1941	No.	
Motor Car (Third-Party Insurance) Amendment Act 1941	No.	
Mulgrave Land Act 1941	No.	
Police Offences (Betting) Act 1941	No.	
Police Offences (Fire Alarms) Act 1941	No.	
Powers of Attorney (War Service) Act 1941	No.	
Public Charitable Trusts Act 1941	No.	
Public Works Loan and Application Act 1941	No.	
Railway Loan Application Act 1941	No.	
Railway Loan Application Act 1941 (No. 2)	No.	
Registration of Births Deaths and Marriages Act 1941	No.	
Revocation of Crown Reservations Act 1941	No.	
Road Traffic (Amendment) Act 1941	No.	
Stamps (Increased Duty Continuance) Act 1941	No.	
State Development Act 1941	No.	
State Forests (Timber Salvage) Loan and Application (Amendment) Act 1941	No.	
State Forests Loan Application Act 1941	No.	
Surplus Revenue Act 1941	No.	
Transfer of Land Act 1941	No.	
Transport Regulation (Amendment) Act 1941	No.	
Transport Regulation (Sunday Carriage) Act 1941	No.	
Unemployment Relief Tax (Rates) Act 1941	No.	
Water Act 1941	No.	
Water Supply Loans and Application Act 1941	No.	
Workers' Compensation (Amendment) Act 1941	No.	

== Sources ==
- "1941 Victorian Historical Acts". AustLII.
