= List of acts of the Parliament of Victoria from 1921 =

This is a list of acts of the Parliament of Victoria, Australia for the year 1921.

== 1921 ==
Short title, or popular name	Citation	Royal assent
Long title
	12 Geo. V. No. 3120	8 July 1921
An Act to apply out of the Consolidated Revenue the sum of Three Millions and eighteen thousand eight hundred and forty-nine pounds to the service of the year One thousand nine hundred and twenty-one and One thousand nine hundred and twenty-two.
	12 Geo. V. No. 3121	8 September 1921
An Act to apply out of the Consolidated Revenue the sum of One million two hundred and eighty-six thousand two hundred and fifty-three pounds to the service of the year One thousand nine hundred and twenty-one and One thousand nine hundred and twenty-two.
	12 Geo. V. No. 3122	23 September 1921
An Act to apply out of the Consolidated Revenue the sum of Five hundred and eleven thousand nine hundred and eighty-three pounds to the service of the year One thousand nine hundred and twenty and One thousand nine hundred and twenty-one.
	12 Geo. V. No. 3129	6 October 1921
An Act to apply out of the Consolidated Revenue the sum of Nine hundred and one thousand seven hundred and twenty-two pounds to the service of the year One thousand nine hundred and twenty-one and One thousand nine hundred and twenty-two.
	12 Geo. V. No. 3135	12 November 1921
An Act to apply out of the Consolidated Revenue the sum of Two millions one hundred and seventy-four thousand eight hundred and seventy-two pounds to the service of the year One thousand nine hundred and twenty-one and One thousand nine hundred and twenty-two.
Geelong Land Act 1921 (repealed)	12 Geo. V. No. 3143	6 December 1921
An Act to provide for divesting certain Land in the City of Geelong out of the Geelong Harbor Trust Commissioners and for the Reservation from Sale permanently of such Land as a Site for a Soldiers' Memorial Park and Recreation Ground. (Repealed by Statute Law Revision Act 1984 (No. 10087))
Agricultural Education Act 1921	12 Geo. V. No. 3147	14 December 1921
An Act to amend the Surplus Revenue Act 1919 (Note: Surplus Revenue Act 1919 (10 Geo. V. No. 3021)) and the Agricultural Education Act 1919. (Note: Agricultural Education Act 1919 (10 Geo. V. No. 3043))
Port Fairy to Yambuk and Won Wron to Woodside Railways Construction Act 1921 (repealed)	12 Geo. V. No. 3152	21 December 1921
An Act to authorize the Construction by the State of Lines of Railway for Developmental Purposes from Port Fairy to Yambuk and from Won Wron to Woodside and for other purposes. (Repealed by Transport Act 1983 (No. 9921))
Administration and Probate Act 1921 (repealed)	12 Geo. V. No. 3154	21 December 1921
An Act to amend Part VI. of the Administration and Probate Act 1915. (Note: Administration and Probate Act 1915 (6 Geo. V. No. 2611)) (Repealed by Administration and Probate Act 1928 (19 Geo. V. No. 3632))
	12 Geo. V. No. 3170	21 December 1921
An Act to apply a sum out of the Consolidated Revenue to the service of the year ending on the thirtieth day of June One thousand nine hundred and twenty-two and to appropriate the Supplies granted in this and the last preceding Session of Parliament.
Ballarat Water Commissioners Act 1921	12 Geo. V. No.	
Betting Tax Act 1921	12 Geo. V. No.	
Betting Tax Act 1921 (No. 2)	12 Geo. V. No.	
Boilers Inspection Act 1921	12 Geo. V. No.	
Colac to Alvie Railway Construction Act 1921	12 Geo. V. No.	
Coongulmerang Cemetery Act 1921	12 Geo. V. No.	
Country Roads Act 1921	12 Geo. V. No.	
Country Roads Act 1921 (No. 2)	12 Geo. V. No.	
Discharged Soldiers Settlement Act 1921	12 Geo. V. No.	
Dogs Act 1921	12 Geo. V. No.	
Electoral Act 1920	12 Geo. V. No.	
Electricity Supply Loan Act 1921	12 Geo. V. No.	
Firearms Act 1921	12 Geo. V. No.	
Geelong Gas Company's Act 1921	12 Geo. V. No.	
Geelong Waterworks and Sewerage (Borrowing Powers) Act 1921	12 Geo. V. No.	
House Committee Act 1921	12 Geo. V. No.	
Income Tax Act 1921	12 Geo. V. No.	
Inter-State Destitute Persons Relief Act 1921	12 Geo. V. No.	
Land Act 1921	12 Geo. V. No.	
Land Tax Act 1921	12 Geo. V. No.	
Lands Compensation Act 1921	12 Geo. V. No.	
Legislative Council Elections Act 1921	12 Geo. V. No.	
Licensing Magistrates Act 1921	12 Geo. V. No.	
Local Government Act 1921	12 Geo. V. No.	
Lunacy Act 1921	12 Geo. V. No.	
Marriage (Validation) Act 1921	12 Geo. V. No.	
Melbourne and Metropolitan Board of Works Act 1921	12 Geo. V. No.	
Mildura Irrigation Trusts Act 1921	12 Geo. V. No.	
Mines Act 1921	12 Geo. V. No.	
Municipal Endowment Act 1921	12 Geo. V. No.	
Pounds Act 1921	12 Geo. V. No.	
Public Service Act 1921	12 Geo. V. No.	
Railway Loan Application Act 1921	12 Geo. V. No.	
Railways Advances (Stores Suspense Account) Act 1921	12 Geo. V. No.	
Railways Classification Board Act 1921	12 Geo. V. No.	
Red Cliffs to Millewa North Railway Construction Act 1921	12 Geo. V. No.	
Returned Sailors and Soldiers Imperial League of Australia Act 1921	12 Geo. V. No.	
Smeaton Land Act 1921	12 Geo. V. No.	
State Electricity Commission Act 1921	12 Geo. V. No.	
State Savings Bank Act 1921	12 Geo. V. No.	
Surplus Revenue Act 1921	12 Geo. V. No.	
Constitution Act Amendment Act 1920	12 Geo. V. No.	
Transfer of Land Act 1921	12 Geo. V. No.	
Victorian Government Loan Act 1921	12 Geo. V. No.	
Victorian Hotel, Gisborne, Licence Act 1921	12 Geo. V. No.	
Victorian Loan Act 1921	12 Geo. V. No.	
Victorian Loan Act 1921 (No. 2)	12 Geo. V. No.	
Victorian Wheatgrowers Corporation Act 1921	12 Geo. V. No.	
Water Supply Loans Application Act 1921	12 Geo. V. No.	

== Sources ==
- "1921 Victorian Historical Acts". AustLII.
