= Transport (Compliance and Miscellaneous) Act 1983 =

Legislation in Victoria, Australia

Parliament of Victoria
- Long title: An Act to re-enact with amendments the law relating to transport including the law with respect to railways, roads and tramways, to repeal the Country Roads Act 1958, the Melbourne and Metropolitan Tramways Act 1958, the Ministry of Transport Act 1958, the Railway Lands Acquisition Act 1958, the Railways Act 1958, the Road Traffic Act 1958, the Transport Regulation Act 1958, the Melbourne Underground Rail Loop Act 1970, the Recreation Vehicles Act 1973, the Railway Construction and Property Board Act 1979 and certain other Acts, to make consequential amendments to various Acts and for other purposes.
- Citation: No. 9921 of 1983
- Territorial extent: Victoria
- Passed by: Legislative Assembly
- Passed: 14 June 1983
- Passed by: Legislative Council
- Passed: 14 June 1983
- Royal assent: 26 June 1983
- Commenced: 5 May 1983 (s. 246); 1 July 1983 (whole Act)

Legislative history

Initiating chamber: Legislative Assembly
- Bill title: Transport Bill
- Introduced by: Steve Crabb
- First reading: 4 May 1983
- Second reading: 5–31 May 1983
- Committee of the whole: 31 May–1 June 1983
- Third reading: 1 June 1983

Revising chamber: Legislative Council
- Bill title: Transport Bill
- Member(s) in charge: Rod Mackenzie
- First reading: 1 June 1983
- Second reading: 2–14 June 1983
- Committee of the whole: 14 June 1983
- Third reading: 14 June 1983

Final stages
- Legislative Council amendments considered by the Legislative Assembly: 14 June 1983

Amended by
- Transport Integration Act 2010 (No. 6 of 2010)
- Status: Amended

The Transport (Compliance and Miscellaneous) Act 1983 (No. 9921), formerly known as the Transport Act 1983, is a prime statute regulating transport activities in the State of Victoria, Australia. Key areas regulated by the statute currently include taxi and hire car services and compliance and enforcement, particularly in areas like safety and public transport ticketing and conduct.

The act was once the leading transport statute in Victoria but this is no longer the case as that position has been taken by the Transport Integration Act 2010. Nonetheless, the Transport (Compliance and Integration) Act remains a key transport statute in Victoria particularly in a support capacity to the Transport Integration Act 2010 and to safety scheme and other statutes.

== Short history ==
The Transport (Compliance and Miscellaneous) Act 1983 was initially enacted as the Transport Act 1983 which until June 2010 was the principal land transport statute in Victoria.

The Transport Act 1983 initially established the main land transport organisations in Victoria following major institutional reform in the Victorian transport portfolio in the early 1980s. The Transport Act 1983 also contained the key land transport regulatory schemes. However, the development and enactment of the Transport Integration Act 2010 eventually led to that statute becoming the principal transport statute in Victoria, relegating the Transport Act to a secondary role.

In effect, the major reform activity of the then Victorian Government's Transport Legislation Review led to substantial changes in the directions and style of Victoria's transport policy and legislation. The Transport Integration Act 2010 developed by the review effectively removed the organisational establishment parts from the Transport Act 1983 as Victoria's transport agencies were re-established and reformed with cleaner and newer charters under the Transport Integration Act 2010. In addition, the Transport Act was progressively stripped of many of its substantive transport regulation schemes over many years from the mid-1990s to around 2010 due to the development and enactment of a range of stand alone transport regulation statutes, many of them under the auspices of the Transport Legislation Review.

These two factors combined and the fact that the Transport Act 1983 had, unlike the Transport Integration Act 2010, never applied to ports and marine activities and effectively stripped the Transport Act 1983 of its pre-eminence.

== Position in transport legislation hierarchy ==
Today, the Transport (Compliance and Miscellaneous) Act 1983 largely operates as a support statute in the hierarchy of Victorian transport statutes. It forms part of the transport policy and legislation framework in Victoria headed by the Transport Integration Act 2010. As a result, the application of the Transport (Compliance and Miscellaneous) Act 1983 is subject to the overarching transport system vision, transport system objectives and decision making principles in the Transport Integration Act 2010.

== Act content ==
The content of the Transport (Compliance and Miscellaneous) Act 1983 consists of the following -

=== Part 1 - Preliminary ===
This part contains some formal provisions covering title, commencement and definitions. It also confirms that the act is transport legislation for the purposes of the Transport Integration Act 2010.

=== Part 2 - Administration ===
The act no longer contains provisions which establish transport agencies. Part 2 of the act, on the other hand, contains a number of provisions which empower or relate to agencies established under the Transport Integration Act 2010. For example, the part contains powers able to be exercised by the Director of Public Transport such as powers relating to use and modification of infrastructure. In addition, the Part contains a number of important financial provisions such as the establishment and operation of the Public Transport Fund.

=== Part 3 - Powers of the Corporation ===
Part 3 of the act contains few provisions. Those that remain though are important and concern land acquisition and development for the City Loop, regulation making powers and related provisions.

=== Part 4 - Financial ===
Most of part 4 has been repealed by other statutes. It does, however, contain a provision about financial guarantees.

=== Part 5 - Chief Investigator, Transport and Marine Safety Investigations ===
Part 5 contains a number of substantive provisions relating to the Chief Investigator, Transport Safety. Included in the part are special investigation powers for the Chief Investigator, provisions relating to the compilation and issue of reports and a range of miscellaneous provisions concerning gathering and use of information.

=== Part 6 - Licensing of Certain Vehicles and Driver Accreditation ===
Part 6 of the act containing provisions relating to the taxi industry and other small commercial passenger vehicles including hire cars and special purpose vehicles. The part represents an anomaly in the structure of Victorian transport legislation as other major transport industries in the State are regulated by special purpose statutes.

The provisions in the part are extensive. They require the licensing of taxis and other small commercial passenger vehicles. Requirements are included concerning the mandatory accreditation of taxi industry participants including licence holders, operators and networks. This part also provides for the accreditation of drivers of taxis, hire cars and buses and, at odds with the rest of the part, provisions relating to requirements for the preparation of transport plans where special public or private events affect the operation of transport services. Finally, the act contains a range of inquiry-related provisions which support the activities of the Taxi Services Commission as part of the Victorian Government's current Taxi Industry Inquiry.

=== Part 7 - Prosecutions, Enforcement and Penalties and Other Matters ===
Part 7 contains a range of provisions which predominantly concern the enforcement of transport offences. Provision is made for the issue of transport infringements for transport offences but also provides for various powers including name and address and arrest powers. The part also sets out a number of offences including in relation to dishonesty.

The part also contains a number of schemes relating to public transport enforcement. For example, it requires the authorisation of persons who conduct ticketing and conduct enforcement activities on Victoria's train, tram and bus networks. In addition, the Part sets out an enforcement accreditation scheme for passenger transport companies which must be accredited by the Department of Transport before being able to employ or engage authorised officers. The part also contains a number of specific transport offences relating to dangerous conduct or conduct affecting amenity on public transport.

The final divisions in part 7 make provision to support public transport safety schemes administered by the Director, Transport Safety for the rail and bus sectors. The provisions provide for the appointment and powers of transport safety officers including by establishing inspection and search and seizure powers. Also included in this area of the Part are a range of provisions conferring power to issue sanctions on the Director, Transport Safety and the courts in respect of breaches of transport safety laws. Sanctions include improvement notices, prohibition notices, enforceable undertakings commercial benefits penalties and exclusion orders.

=== Part 8 - Miscellaneous and transitional ===
Consistent with its title, part 8 sets out a range of miscellaneous and transitional provisions including those relating to the abolition of former transport agencies, service of documents, rail noise, provisions relating to tourist railways, transfer of staff and other sundry matters. A range of detailed transitional provisions were recently added to this Part as a result of the establishment of the Taxi Services Commission and the positioning of the Secretary of the Department of Transport as Victoria's current taxi and small commercial passenger vehicle regulator.

=== Schedules ===
Nine of the twelve schedules to the act have been repealed. Only one is likely to have substantive effect and relates to taxi industry assignments.

== See also ==
- Transport law in Australia
