= Statute Law Revision Programme =

The Statute Law Revision Programme is a project of the Law Reform Commission responsible for the preparation of statute law revision Bills in Ireland.

The Programme, previously known as the Statute law revision project, operated in the office of the Attorney General from 2003 to 2012 and in the Department of Public Expenditure and Reform from 2012 to 2016. Its operation was taken over by the Law Reform Commission in 2020. The great majority of the legislation repealed have been acts passed by the Parliament of the United Kingdom and its predecessors.

While introducing the 2016 Statute Law Revision Bill, Minister Damien English stated that "To date, over 60,000 items of legislation have been either expressly or implicitly repealed under the programme. This Bill, when enacted, together with the five previous Statute Law Revision Acts, will collectively be the most extensive set of repealing measures in the history of the State and the most extensive set of statute law revision measures ever enacted anywhere in the world."

The legislation taken as a whole has comprehensively reviewed primary legislation up to 1950 and secondary legislation up to 1860.

== Legislation enacted ==
To date seven pieces of legislation have been prepared under the Programme and its predecessor initiatives:

- Statute Law Revision (Pre-1922) Act 2005
- Statute Law Revision Act 2007
- Statute Law Revision Act 2009
- Statute Law Revision Act 2012
- Statute Law Revision Act 2015
- Statute Law Revision Act 2016
- Statute Law Revision Act 2025

== Areas yet to be reviewed ==
The programme is expected to eventually complete review of the following areas of legislative material:

- Secondary legislation 1861 to date
- Primary legislation 1951 to date
- Charters and letters patent 1066 to date
