= Statute Law Revision (Pre-1922) Act 2005 =

Oireachtas
- Long title: AN ACT TO PROMOTE THE REVISION OF STATUTE LAW BY REPEALING ENACTMENTS PASSED BEFORE 6 DECEMBER 1922 WHICH HAVE CEASED TO BE IN FORCE OR HAVE BECOME UNNECESSARY.
- Citation: No. 32 of 2005
- Enacted by: Dáil Éireann
- Signed: 18 December 2005
- Commenced: 18 December 2005
- Status: Current legislation

The Statute Law Revision (Pre-1922) Act 2005 (No. 32 of 2005) is an Act of the Oireachtas. Section 1 of the Act, with the Schedule, repeals statutes of Ireland, England, Great Britain and the United Kingdom of Great Britain and Ireland. The Act repealed around 200 statutes and is the first in a series of recent Statute Law Revision Acts enacted in Ireland as part of the Statute Law Revision Programme. It was followed by the Statute Law Revision Act 2007, the Statute Law Revision Act 2009 and the Statute Law Revision Act 2012.

This Act has not been amended.

== See also ==
- Statute Law Revision Act
