= List of acts of the Parliament of Victoria from 2007 =

This is a list of acts of the Parliament of Victoria, Australia for the year 2007.

== 2007 ==
Short title, or popular name	Citation	Royal assent
Long title
Control of Weapons Amendment (Penalties) Act 2007	No. 1 of 2007	6 March 2007
An Act to amend the Control of Weapons Act 1990 (Note: Control of Weapons Act 1990 (No. 24 of 1990)) to increase the penalties for certain offences relating to prohibited and controlled weapons and for other purposes.
Interpretation of Legislation Amendment Act 2007	No. 2 of 2007	6 March 2007
Murray-Darling Basin Amendment Act 2007	No. 3 of 2007	6 March 2007
Aan Act to amend the Murray-Darling Basin Act 1993 (Note: Murray-Darling Basin Act 1993 (No. 39 of 1993)) to approve an amendment to the Murray-Darling Basin Agreement to facilitate the operation of the Murray-Darling Basin Commission's water business on appropriate commercial principles and for other purposes.
Parliamentary Legislation Amendment Act 2007	No. 4 of 2007	
Pay-roll Tax Amendment (Bushfire and Emergency Service) Act 2007	No. 5 of 2007	
Public Prosecutions Amendment Act 2007	No. 6 of 2007	
Livestock Disease Control Amendment Act 2007	No. 7 of 2007	
Prahran Mechanics' Institute Amendment Act 2007	No. 8 of 2007	
Victims of Crime Assistance Amendment Act 2007	No. 9 of 2007	
Drugs, Poisons and Controlled Substances Amendment (Repeal of Part X) Act 2007	No. 10 of 2007	
Gambling Regulation Amendment (Review Panel) Act 2007	No. 11 of 2007	
Legal Profession Amendment Act 2007	No. 12 of 2007	
Major Events (Aerial Advertising) Act 2007	No. 13 of 2007	8 May 2007
An Act to provide for the regulation, management and control of aerial advertising at major events in Victoria, to consequentially amend other Acts and for other purposes.
Road Legislation Amendment Act 2007	No. 14 of 2007	
Infertility Treatment Amendment Act 2007	No. 15 of 2007	
Equal Opportunity Amendment Act 2007	No. 16 of 2007	
Fair Trading and Consumer Acts Amendment Act 2007	No. 17 of 2007	
Gambling and Racing Legislation Amendment (Sports Betting) Act 2007	No. 18 of 2007	
Howard Florey Institute of Experimental Physiology and Medicine (Repeal) Act 2007	No. 19 of 2007	29 May 2007
An Act to repeal the Howard Florey Institute of Experimental Physiology and Medicine Act 1971 (Note: Howard Florey Institute of Experimental Physiology and Medicine Act 1971 (No. 8108)) and for other purposes.
Appropriation (Parliament 2007/2008) Act 2007	No. 20 of 2007	12 June 2007
An Act for the appropriation of certain sums out of the Consolidated Fund for the Parliament in respect of the financial year 2007/2008 and for other purposes.
Statute Law Repeals Act 2007	No. 21 of 2007	12 June 2007
An Act to revise the statute law of Victoria by repealing spent Acts.
State Taxation and Gambling Legislation Amendment (Budget Measures) Act 2007	No. 22 of 2007	
Appropriation (2007/2008) Act 2007	No. 23 of 2007	26 June 2007
An Act for the appropriation of certain sums out of the Consolidated Fund for the ordinary annual services of the Government for the financial year 2007/2008 and for other purposes.
Courts Legislation Amendment (Judicial Education and Other Matters) Act 2007	No. 24 of 2007	26 June 2007
Health Professions Registration Amendment Act 2007	No. 25 of 2007	26 June 2007
Payroll Tax Act 2007	No. 26 of 2007	26 June 2007
An Act to re-enact and modernise the law relating to payroll tax, to harmonise payroll tax law with New South Wales, to repeal the Pay-roll Tax Act 1971, (Note: Pay-roll Tax Act 1971 (No. 8154)) to amend the Taxation Administration Act 1997 (Note: Taxation Administration Act 1997 (No. 40 of 1997)) and other Acts and for other purposes.
Professional Standards Amendment Act 2007	No. 27 of 2007	26 June 2007
Statute Law Revision Act 2007 (repealed)	No. 28 of 2007	26 June 2007
An Act to revise the statute law of Victoria. (Repealed by Statute Law Revision Act 2007 (No. 28 of 2007)
Water Acts Amendment (Enforcement and Other Matters) Act 2007	No. 29 of 2007	
Accident Towing Services Act 2007	No. 30 of 2007	24 July 2007
An Act to make provision for accident towing services and other matters relating to the towing, storage and repair of motor vehicles, to amend the Infringements Act 2006, (Note: Infringements Act 2006 (No. 12 of 2006)) the Melbourne City Link Act 1995, (Note: Melbourne City Link Act 1995 (No. 107 of 1995)) the Police Regulation Act 1958, (Note: Police Regulation Act 1958 (No. 6338)) the Road Safety Act 1986 (Note: Road Safety Act 1986 (No. 127 of 1986)) and the Transport Act 1983 (Note: Transport Act 1983 (No. 9921)) and for other purposes.
Building Amendment (Plumbing) Act 2007	No. 31 of 2007	
Crimes Amendment (DNA Database) Act 2007	No. 32 of 2007	
State Taxation Acts Amendment Act 2007	No. 33 of 2007	
Accident Compensation Amendment Act 2007	No. 34 of 2007	
Energy Legislation Amendment Act 2007	No. 35 of 2007	
Magistrates' Court and Coroners Acts Amendment Act 2007	No. 36 of 2007	
Superannuation Legislation Amendment (Contribution Splitting and Other Matters) Act 2007	No. 37 of 2007	
Wills Amendment Act 2007	No. 38 of 2007	
Gambling Regulation Amendment Act 2007	No. 39 of 2007	
Outworkers and Contractors Legislation Amendment Act 2007	No. 40 of 2007	
Parliamentary Salaries and Superannuation Amendment Act 2007 (repealed)	No. 41 of 2007	
(Repealed by Statute Law Revision Act 2013 (No. 70 of 2013)
Confiscation Amendment Act 2007	No. 42 of 2007	
Gene Technology Amendment Act 2007	No. 43 of 2007	
Grain Handling and Storage Amendment Act 2007	No. 44 of 2007	
Land (Revocation of Reservations) Act 2007	No. 45 of 2007	
Legal Profession Amendment (Education) Act 2007	No. 46 of 2007	
Planning and Environment Amendment Act 2007	No. 47 of 2007	
Royal Children's Hospital (Land) Act 2007	No. 48 of 2007	
Summary Offences Amendment (Upskirting) Act 2007	No. 49 of 2007	
Firearms Amendment Act 2007	No. 50 of 2007	
Fisheries Amendment Act 2007	No. 51 of 2007	
Justice and Road Legislation Amendment (Law Enforcement) Act 2007	No. 52 of 2007	
Justice Legislation Amendment Act 2007	No. 53 of 2007	
Building Amendment Act 2007	No. 54 of 2007	
Energy Legislation Further Amendment Act 2007	No. 55 of 2007	
Working with Children Amendment Act 2007	No. 56 of 2007	
Crimes Amendment (Rape) Act 2007	No. 57 of 2007	
Education and Training Reform Miscellaneous Amendments Act 2007	No. 58 of 2007	
Graffiti Prevention Act 2007	No. 59 of 2007	
Transport Accident and Accident Compensation Acts Amendment Act 2007	No. 60 of 2007	
Electricity Safety Amendment Act 2007	No. 61 of 2007	
Melbourne and Olympic Parks Amendment Act 2007	No. 62 of 2007	
Port Services Amendment Act 2007	No. 63 of 2007	
Agent-General and Commissioners for Victoria Act 2007	No. 64 of 2007	11 December 2007
An Act to continue to provide for the appointment of an Agent-General for Victoria, to provide for the appointment of other Commissioners for Victoria, to repeal the Agent-General's Act 1994 (Note: Agent-General's Act 1994 (No. 11 of 1994)) and for other purposes.
Animals Legislation Amendment (Animal Care) Act 2007	No. 65 of 2007	11 December 2007
National Electricity (Victoria) Amendment Act 2007	No. 66 of 2007	11 December 2007
An Act to amend the National Electricity (Victoria) Act 2005 (Note: National Electricity (Victoria) Act 2005 (No. 8 of 2005)) and for other purposes.
Police Regulation Amendment Act 2007	No. 67 of 2007	11 December 2007
State Taxation and Accident Compensation Acts Amendment Act 2007	No. 68 of 2007	11 December 2007
Transport Legislation Amendment Act 2007	No. 69 of 2007	11 December 2007
An Act for an Act to amend the Transport Act 1983, the Public Transport Competition Act 1995, (Note: Public Transport Competition Act 1995 (No. 68 of 1995)) the Rail Safety Act 2006 (Note: Rail Safety Act 2006 (No. 9 of 2006)) and other Acts and for other purposes.
Victorian Energy Efficiency Target Act 2007	No. 70 of 2007	11 December 2007
An Act to promote the reduction of greenhouse gas emissions by establishing the Victorian Energy Efficiency Target scheme and to amend the Essential Services Commission Act 2001 (Note: Essential Services Commission Act 2001 (No. 62 of 2001)) to confer functions on the Essential Services Commission and for other purposes.
Victorian Workers' Wages Protection Act 2007	No. 71 of 2007	11 December 2007
An Act to regulate the payment of wages and the ability of an employer to make deductions from an employee's wages, to provide enforcement mechanisms and remedies, to amend the Public Sector (Union Fees) Act 1992 (Note: Public Sector (Union Fees) Act 1992 (No. 74 of 1992)) and the Outworkers (Improved Protection) Act 2003 (Note: Outworkers (Improved Protection) Act 2003 (No. 22 of 2003)) and for other purposes.
Gambling Legislation Amendment (Problem Gambling and Other Measures) Act 2007	No. 72 of 2007	
Liquor Control Reform Amendment Act 2007	No. 73 of 2007	
Road Legislation Further Amendment Act 2007	No. 74 of 2007	18 December 2007
An Act to amend the Road Safety Act 1986, the Chattel Securities Act 1987, (Note: Chattel Securities Act 1987 (No. 15 of 1987)) the EastLink Project Act 2004, (Note: Mitcham-Frankston Project Act 2004 (No. 39 of 2004)) the Melbourne City Link Act 1995, the Road Management Act 2004 (Note: Road Management Act 2004 (No. 12 of 2004)) and the Transport Act 1983 and for other purposes.

== Sources ==
- "Acts as made: 2007". Victoria Legislation.
