= List of acts of the Parliament of Victoria from 1927 =

This is a list of acts of the Parliament of Victoria, Australia for the year 1927.

== 1927 ==
Short title, or popular name	Citation	Royal assent
Long title
	18 Geo. V. No. 3502	7 July 1927
An Act to apply out of the Consolidated Revenue the sum of Three million and twenty-eight thousand eight hundred and twenty-eight pounds to the service of the year One thousand nine hundred and twenty-seven and One thousand nine hundred and twenty-eight.
	18 Geo. V. No. 3503	14 July 1927
An Act to apply out of the Consolidated Revenue the sum of Five hundred and sixty-five thousand and eighty-seven pounds to the service of the year One thousand nine hundred and twenty-six and One thousand nine hundred and twenty-seven.
	18 Geo. V. No. 3507	1 September 1927
An Act to apply out of the Consolidated Revenue the sum of One million six hundred and twenty-one thousand seven hundred and eighty-four pounds to the service of the year One thousand nine hundred and twenty-seven and One thousand nine hundred and twenty-eight.
Footscray Land Act 1927 (repealed)	18 Geo. V. No. 3508	6 September 1927
An Act to revoke in part the Reservation and Crown Grant of certain Land in the City of Footscray permanently reserved as a Site for a Mechanics' Institute and to provide for the Transfer of Portion to the Minister of Public Instruction and to declare Portion to be a Public Highway and for other purposes. (Repealed by Statute Law Revision Act 1984 (No. 10087))
State Electricity Commission (Shepparton Purchase) Act 1927	18 Geo. V. No. 3509	13 September 1927
An Act relating to the Purchase by the State Electricity Commission of Victoria of a certain Undertaking at Shepparton for the Supply of Electricity.
Geelong Land Act 1927	18 Geo. V. No. 3511	21 September 1927
An Act to provide for the Closing of Portion of a certain Street in the City of Geelong and to provide for the Reservation of Part of the Land forming the same as a Site for Hospital Purposes and Part as a Site for State School Purposes.
Walpeup West Lands Act 1927	18 Geo. V. No. 3512	21 September 1927
An Act relating to certain Crown Lands situate within the Walpeup West Waterworks District and certain Improvements thereon.
Victorian Government Debentures Regulation Act 1927 (repealed)	18 Geo. V. No. 3513	21 September 1927
An Act to amend the Victorian Stock and Debentures Conversion Act 1905 (Note: Victorian Stock and Debentures Conversion Act 1905 (5 Edw. VII. No. 1996)) and the Victorian Government Debentures Regulation Act 1912. (Note: Victorian Government Debentures Regulation Act 1912 (3 Geo. V. No. 2404)) (Repealed by Treasury Legislation (Repeal) Act 2005 (No. 73 of 2005))
Spencer-street Bridge Act 1927	18 Geo. V. No. 3515	28 September 1927
An Act relating to the Construction and Maintenance across the River Yarra Yarra of a Bridge at or near Spencer-street Melbourne and for other purposes.
Charlton Land Act 1927	18 Geo. V. No. 3516	5 October 1927
An Act to provide for the Revocation of the Reservation of certain Crown Lands at or near Charlton and the Sale of Portion thereof the closing of Portion of a Street in Charlton and the Sale of the Land forming the same the Application of the Proceeds of any such Sale and the Reservation of the Remainder of the said Crown Lands and for other purposes.
Altona Railway Act 1927	18 Geo. V. No. 3517	5 October 1927
An Act to approve and ratify and provide for carrying out an Agreement between Alton a Beach Estates Limited the Premier of the State of Victoria and Arthur Rickard and Co. Limited respecting the Transfer to the State of the Altona Railway and for other Purposes.
Law Institute Act 1927	18 Geo. V. No. 3518	5 October 1927
An Act to amend the Law Institute Act 1917. (Note: Law Institute Act 1917 (8 Geo. V. No. 2903))
Cowwarr Land Act 1927	18 Geo. V. No. 3520	5 October 1927
An Act to revoke the Reservation of certain Land in the Township of Cowwarr permanently reserved as a Site for a Mechanics' Institute and Free Library and to provide for the Payment of certain Moneys to the Committee of the Cowwarr Mechanics' Institute and for other purposes.
	18 Geo. V. No. 3521	5 October 1927
An Act to apply out of the Consolidated Revenue the sum of One million five hundred and forty-four thousand nine hundred and fifty-three pounds to the service of the year One thousand nine hundred and twenty-seven and One thousand nine hundred and twenty-eight.
Mildura College Lands Act 1927	18 Geo. V. No. 3522	11 October 1927
An Act to amend the Mildura College Lands Act 1916. (Note: Mildura College Lands Act 1916 (7 Geo. V. No. 2842))
	18 Geo. V. No. 3526	10 November 1927
An Act to apply out of the Consolidated Revenue the sum of One million four hundred and thirty-two thousand six hundred and one pounds to the service of the year One thousand nine hundred and twenty-seven and One thousand nine hundred and twenty-eight.
Cranbourne Race Meetings Act 1927	18 Geo. V. No. 3527	21 November 1927
An Act relating to Race Meetings at Cranbourne.
Trinity College Act 1927	18 Geo. V. No. 3529	21 November 1927
An Act relating to a College affiliated to and connected with the University of Melbourne and known as Trinity College.
Casterton to Nangeela Railway Construction Act 1927	18 Geo. V. No. 3531	21 November 1927
An Act to authorize the Construction by the State of a Line of Railway from Casterton to Nangeela.
	18 Geo. V. No. 3536	7 December 1927
An Act to apply out of the Consolidated Revenue the sum of One million five hundred and eighteen thousand eight hundred and eighty-four pounds to the service of the year One thousand nine hundred and twenty-seven and One thousand nine hundred and twenty-eight.
Architects Registration Act 1927 (repealed)	18 Geo. V. No. 3539	13 December 1927
An Act to amend Section Seven of the Architects Registration Act 1922. (Note: Architects Registration Act 1922 (13 Geo. V. No. 3207)) (Repealed by Architects Act 1928 (19 Geo. V. No. 3638))
Coburg and Somerton Railway Act 1927	18 Geo. V. No. 3541	21 December 1927
An Act to provide for the Re-opening of Portion of the Coburg and Somerton Railway situate between the Fawkner and Somerton Stations and for other purposes.
Victorian Government Stock Act 1927 (repealed)	18 Geo. V. No. 3544	21 December 1927
An Act to give further Facilities to Holders of Victorian Government Stock and for other purposes. (Repealed by Treasury Legislation (Repeal) Act 2005 (No. 73 of 2005))
Apprenticeship Act 1927 (repealed)	18 Geo. V. No. 3546	21 December 1927
An Act to amend the Law relating to Apprenticeship and for other purposes. (Repealed by Apprenticeship Act 1928 (19 Geo. V. No. 3636))
Commonwealth and States Financial Agreement Act 1927 (repealed)	18 Geo. V. No. 3554	30 December 1927
An Act to approve an Agreement between the Commonwealth of Australia and the States of New South Wales, Victoria, Queensland, South Australia, Western Australia and Tasmania concerning the Adjustment of the Financial Relations of the Commonwealth and the said States, and to amend certain Acts, and for other purposes. (Repealed by Treasury Legislation (Repeal) Act 2005 (No. 73 of 2005))
Harbor Boards Act 1927 or the Harbour Boards Act 1927	18 Geo. V. No. 3560	30 December 1927
An Act to make provision for Harbor Boards for certain Ports and for other purposes.
Nowingi to Millewa South Railway Construction Act 1927 (repealed)	18 Geo. V. No. 3561	30 December 1927
An Act to authorize the Construction by the State of a Line of Railway from Nowingi to Millewa South. (Repealed by Transport Act 1983 (No. 9921))
Dried Fruits Act 1927 (repealed)	18 Geo. V. No. 3562	30 December 1927
An Act to amend the Dried Fruits Acts. (Repealed by Dried Fruits Act 1928 (19 Geo. V. No. 3670))
Victorian Railways Commissioners Act 1927	18 Geo. V. No. 3563	30 December 1927
An Act to validate the Appointment of William Montgomery Shannon as a Victorian Railways Commissioner and for other purposes.
Fire Brigades Act 1927 (repealed)	18 Geo. V. No. 3567	30 December 1927
An Act to authorize the Metropolitan Fire Brigades Board to borrow a further Sum not exceeding Fifty thousand pounds. (Repealed by Statute Law Revision Act 1984 (No. 10087))
Melbourne to Footscray Road Act 1927 (repealed)	18 Geo. V. No. 3574	30 December 1927
An Act to make provision with respect to the Construction and Maintenance of a Road between Melbourne and Footscray and Matters incidental thereto. (Repealed by Statute Law Revision Act 1984 (No. 10087))
Betting (Mechanical Coursing) Act 1927	18 Geo. V. No.	
Business Names Act 1927	18 Geo. V. No.	
Country Roads Act 1927	18 Geo. V. No.	
Cultivation Advances Act 1927	18 Geo. V. No.	
Electoral (Absent Voters) Act 1927	18 Geo. V. No.	
Evidence Act 1927	18 Geo. V. No.	
Factories and Shops Act 1927	18 Geo. V. No.	
Fallowing Advances Act 1927	18 Geo. V. No.	
Forests Act 1927	18 Geo. V. No.	
Geelong Harbor Trust Acts (Amendment) 1927	18 Geo. V. No.	
Highways and Vehicles Act 1927	18 Geo. V. No.	
Income Tax Act 1927	18 Geo. V. No.	
Income Tax Acts Amendment Act 1927	18 Geo. V. No.	
Instruments Act 1927	18 Geo. V. No.	
Land Tax Act 1927	18 Geo. V. No.	
Local Government (Borrowing Powers) Act 1927	18 Geo. V. No.	
Medical (Dentists) Act 1927	18 Geo. V. No.	
Melbourne and Metropolitan Board of Works (Borrowing Powers) Act 1927	18 Geo. V. No.	
Melbourne and Metropolitan Board of Works (Contributions) Act 1927	18 Geo. V. No.	
Melbourne and Metropolitan Tramways Act 1927	18 Geo. V. No.	
Melbourne and Metropolitan Tramways Board Act 1927	18 Geo. V. No.	
Metropolitan Town Planning Commission Act 1927	18 Geo. V. No.	
Motor Omnibus (Urban and Country) Act 1927	18 Geo. V. No.	
Motor Omnibus Act 1927	18 Geo. V. No.	
Municipal Endowment Act 1927	18 Geo. V. No.	
Poisons Act 1927	18 Geo. V. No.	
Poor Persons Legal Assistance Act 1927	18 Geo. V. No.	
Postponement of Payments Act 1927	18 Geo. V. No.	
Pounds Act 1927	18 Geo. V. No.	
Railway Loan Application Act 1927	18 Geo. V. No.	
Railways Classification Board Act 1927	18 Geo. V. No.	
Registrar-General's Fees Act 1927	18 Geo. V. No.	
State Savings Bank Act 1927	18 Geo. V. No.	
Supreme Court Act 1927	18 Geo. V. No.	
Swine (Sales) Act 1927	18 Geo. V. No.	
Swine Compensation Act 1927	18 Geo. V. No.	
Treasury Bonds Act 1927	18 Geo. V. No.	
Victorian Government Loans (Debentures) Act 1927	18 Geo. V. No.	
Victorian Loan (Country Sewerage) Act 1927	18 Geo. V. No.	
Victorian Loan (Electricity Supply) and Application Act 1927	18 Geo. V. No.	
Victorian Loan (Public Works) Act 1927	18 Geo. V. No.	
Victorian Loan Act 1927	18 Geo. V. No.	
Victorian Loan Authority Act 1927	18 Geo. V. No.	
Wages Attachment Act 1927	18 Geo. V. No.	
Water Supply Loans Application Act 1927	18 Geo. V. No.	

== Sources ==
- "1927 Victorian Historical Acts". AustLII.
