= List of acts of the Parliament of Victoria from 1934 =

This is a list of acts of the Parliament of Victoria, Australia for the year 1934.

== 1934 ==
Short title, or popular name	Citation	Royal assent
Long title
	No. 4209	8 January 1934
An Act to apply a sum out of the Consolidated Revenue to the service of the year ending on the thirtieth day of June One thousand nine hundred and thirty-four and to appropriate the Supplies granted in this Session of Parliament.
	No. 4211	2 July 1934
An Act to apply out of the Consolidated Revenue the sum of Two million two hundred and ninety-five thousand one hundred and sixty-seven pounds to the service of the year One thousand nine hundred and thirty-four and One thousand nine hundred and thirty-five.
	No. 4214	6 August 1934
An Act to apply out of the Consolidated Revenue the sum of Four hundred and thirty-one thousand one hundred and ninety-three pounds to the service of the year One thousand nine hundred and thirty-three and One thousand nine hundred and thirty-four.
Vacuum Oil Company Proprietary Limited Act 1931 (Repeal) Act 1934	No. 4218	27 August 1934
An Act to repeal the Vacuum Oil Company Proprietary Limited Act 1931. (Note: Vacuum Oil Company Proprietary Limited Act 1931 (No. 3989))
State Electricity Commission Act 1934	No. 4220	6 September 1934
An Act to amend the State Electricity Commission Acts and for other purposes.
	No. 4223	6 September 1934
An Act to apply out of the Consolidated Revenue the sum of One million and fifty-five thousand six hundred and ninety-eight pounds to the service of the year One thousand nine hundred and thirty-four and One thousand nine hundred and thirty-five.
Administration and Probate (Charities) Act 1934	No. 4226	29 September 1934
An Act to amend Section One hundred and sixty of the Administration and Probate Act 1928. (Note: Administration and Probate Act 1928 (19 Geo. V. No. 3632))
Essendon Land Act 1934 (repealed)	No. 4230	29 September 1934
An Act to provide for the Closing of Portion of a certain Street in the Municipal District of the City of Essendon and for other purposes. (Repealed by Statute Law Revision Act 1984 (No. 10087))
Administration and Probate Duties Act 1934	No. 4236	29 September 1934
An Act to continue Part III. of the Finance Act 1930 (Note: Finance Act 1930 (No. 3889)) as amended by the Administration and Probate Duties Act 1931 (Note: Administration and Probate Duties Act 1931 (No. 4017)) and the Administration and Probate Duties Act 1932 (Note: Administration and Probate Duties Act 1932 (No. 4066)) and the Administration and Probate Duties Act 1933. (Note: Administration and Probate Duties Act 1933 (No. 4159))
North Geelong to Fyansford Railway Construction Act 1934 (repealed)	No. 4243	29 September 1934
An Act to amend the North Geelong to Fyansford Railway Construction Act 1916. (Note: North Geelong to Fyansford Railway Construction Act 1916 (7 Geo. V. No. 2879)) (Repealed by Transport Act 1983 (No. 9921))
Unemployment Relief Loan and Application Act 1934 (repealed)	No. 4244	29 September 1934
An Act to amend Sections Three and Five of the Unemployment Relief Loan and Application Act 1932. (Note: Unemployment Relief Loan and Application Act 1932 (No. 4097)) (Repealed by Treasury Legislation (Repeal) Act 2005 (No. 73 of 2005))
Statute Law Revision Act 1934	No. 4264	9 October 1934
An Act to revise the Statute Law and for other purposes.
Grain Elevators Act 1934	No. 4270	9 October 1932
An Act to provide for the Handling of Grain in Bulk by means of the Elevator System, and for other purposes.
Agricultural Lime Act 1934	No. 4271	9 October 1934
An Act relating to the Sale of Agricultural Lime.
Electoral Act 1934	No. 4278	16 October 1934
An Act to make Provision with respect to the Recount of Votes at Parliamentary Elections and a Court of Disputed Returns.
Box Hill Lands Act 1934	No.	
Cattle and Swine (Compensation) Act 1934	No.	
Closer Settlement (Financial) Act 1934	No.	
Commonwealth and States Financial Agreement Act 1934	No.	
Companies (Special Investigations) Act 1934	No.	
Country Roads Board Fund Act 1934	No.	
Cultivation Advances Act 1934	No.	
Education (Fees) Continuation Act 1934	No.	
Entertainments Tax Act 1934	No.	
Factories and Shops Act 1934	No.	
Financial Emergency (Continuation) Act 1934	No.	
Financial Emergency (Mortgages) Continuation Act 1934	No.	
Financial Emergency (Salaries and Pensions) Act 1934	No.	
Friendly Societies Act 1934	No.	
Fruit Growers Relief (Commonwealth Payment) Act 1934	No.	
Geelong and Melbourne Harbor Trusts Act 1934	No.	
Government Advances (Reduction of Interest) Act 1934	No.	
Health (Margarine) Act 1934	No.	
Income Tax Act 1934	No.	
Income Tax Acts Amendment Act 1934	No.	
Land Act 1934	No.	
Land Tax (Amendment) Act 1934	No.	
Land Tax Act 1934	No.	
Landlord and Tenant (Rent Reduction) Continuation Act 1934	No.	
Leitchville Lands Act 1934	No.	
Licensing (Good Friday) Act 1934	No.	
Licensing (Removal) Act 1934	No.	
Local Government (Shire of Moorabbin) Act 1934	No.	
Local Government (Temporary Reduction of Interest) Act 1934	No.	
Local Government Act 1934	No.	
Marriage (Divorce) Act 1933	No.	
Melbourne and Metropolitan Tramways Board Act 1934	No.	
Mildura Irrigation Trust (Drainage) Act 1934	No.	
Milk Board Act 1934	No.	
Mortgages (Powers of Sale) Act 1934	No.	
Property Law (Charitable Requests) Act 1934	No.	
Public Account Advances Act 1934	No.	
Public and Bank Holidays Act 1934	No.	
Public Works Loan Application Act 1934	No.	
Railway Loan Application Act 1934	No.	
River Murray Waters Act 1934	No.	
Sewerage Districts (Temporary Reduction of Interest) Act 1934	No.	
Sewerage Districts Act 1934	No.	
Stamps (Betting) Act 1934	No.	
Stamps Act 1934	No.	
State Forests Loan Application Act 1934	No.	
State Savings Bank Act 1934	No.	
Superannuation (Retirement) Act 1934	No.	
Totalizator Act 1934	No.	
Treasury Bonds Act 1934	No.	
Treasury Overdrafts Act 1934	No.	
Unemployment Relief Tax (Rates) Act 1934	No.	
Victorian Loan Act 1934	No.	
Water Supply Loans Application Act 1934	No.	
West Melbourne Literary Institute Land Act 1934	No.	

== Sources ==
- "1934 Victorian Historical Acts". AustLII.
