= List of acts of the Parliament of Victoria from 1947 =

This is a list of acts of the Parliament of Victoria, Australia for the year 1947.

== 1947 ==
Short title, or popular name	Citation	Royal assent
Long title
	No. 5207	10 June 1947
An Act to apply out of the Consolidated Revenue the sum of One million and twenty-nine thousand four hundred and sixteen pounds to the service of the year One thousand nine hundred and forty-six and One thousand nine hundred and forty-seven.
Private Bill Committees Act 1947	No. 5211	24 June 1947
An Act to provide for the Reimbursement of Expenses of Members of Committees on Private Bills.
	No. 5215	27 June 1947
An Act to apply out of the Consolidated Revenue the sum of Six million seven hundred and twenty-five thousand one hundred and ninety-eight pounds to the service of the year One thousand nine hundred and forty-seven and One thousand nine hundred and forty-eight.
Statute Law Revision Act 1947	No. 5217	1 July 1947
An Act to revise the Statute Law and for other purposes.
Local Government (Private Street Construction) Act 1947	No. 5221	1 July 1947
An Act to authorize Variations in Certain Schemes of Private Street Construction.
	No. 5227	7 October 1947
An Act to apply out of the Consolidated Revenue the sum of Seven hundred and fourteen thousand two hundred and forty-two pounds to the service of the year One thousand nine hundred and forty-six and One thousand nine hundred and forty-seven.
	No. 5228	8 October 1947
An Act to apply out of the Consolidated Revenue the sum of Six million one hundred and seventy-eight thousand nine hundred and seventy-three pounds to the service of the year One thousand nine hundred and forty-seven and One thousand nine hundred and forty-eight.
	No. 5229	16 December 1947
An Act to apply out of the Consolidated Revenue the sum of One million four hundred and forty-one thousand four hundred and fifty-five pounds to the service of the year One thousand nine hundred and forty-seven and One thousand nine hundred and forty-eight.
Wheat Marketing (Winding Up) Amendment Act 1947 (repealed)	No. 5236	16 December 1947
An Act to amend Section Two of the Wheat Marketing (Winding Up) Act 1924. (Note: Wheat Marketing (Winding Up) Act 1924 (15 Geo. V. No. 3338)) (Repealed by Treasury Legislation (Repeal) Act 2005 (No. 73 of 2005))
University (Mildura Branch) Act 1947	No. 5237	16 December 1947
An Act to amend Sections Three and Four of the University (Mildura Branch) Act 1946. (Note: University (Mildura Branch) Act 1946 (No. 5162))
Public Works Loan and Application Act 1947 (repealed)	No. 5240	23 December 1947
An Act to authorize the Raising of further Money for Public Works and other purposes and to sanction the Issue and Application for such Purposes of the Money so raised or of Money in the State Loans Repayment Fund, and for other purposes. (Repealed by Treasury Legislation (Repeal) Act 2005 (No. 73 of 2005))
Administration and Probate Duties Act 1947	No. 5241	23 December 1947
An Act to continue the Operation of Part III. of the Finance Act 1930. (Note: Finance Act 1930 (No. 3889))
Auditor-General's Salary Act 1947	No. 5243	16 December 1947
An Act to increase the Salary of the Auditor-General.
Ballaarat Land Act 1947 (repealed)	No. 5244	23 December 1947
An Act to provide for the Revocation of the Crown Grant and Reservation as a Site for a Town Hall of certain Land in the Parish of Ballaarat, the Reservation of such Land for Educational and other Public Purposes, and the Acquisition of certain other Land by the Minister of Public Instruction. (Repealed by Statute Law Revision Act 1984 (No. 10087))
Public Works Loan and Application (Amendment) Act 1947	No. 5251	23 December 1937
An Act to amend the Public Works Loan and Application Act 1946. (Note: Public Works Loan and Application Act 1946 (No. 5120))
	No. 5262	23 December 1947
An Act to apply a sum out of the Consolidated Revenue to the service of the year ending on the thirtieth day of June One thousand nine hundred and forty-eight and to appropriate Supplies granted in this and the last two preceding Sessions of Parliament.
Building Operations and Building Materials Control (Amendment) Act 1947	No.	
Coal Mine Workers Pensions Act 1947	No.	
Country Roads Board Fund (Amendment) Act 1947	No.	
Country Sewerage Loan and Application Act 1947	No.	
Custodian Trustee Act 1947	No.	
Drought Relief (Amendment) Act 1947	No.	
Drought Relief Act 1947	No.	
Factories and Shops (Bread) Act 1947	No.	
Factories and Shops (Determinations) Act 1947	No.	
Farmers Advances (Amendment) Act 1947	No.	
Forests (Commissioners) Act 1947	No.	
Health (Amendment) Act 1947	No.	
Infectious Diseases Hospital (Amendment) Act 1947	No.	
Land Tax Act 1947	No.	
Local Authorities Superannuation Act 1947	No.	
Melbourne and Metropolitan Board of Works (Contributions) Act 1947	No.	
Melbourne and Metropolitan Tramways (Amendment) Act 1947	No.	
Motor Car (Registration Fees) Act 1947	No.	
Municipal Endowment (Temporary Discontinuance) Act 1947	No.	
Officials in Parliament Act 1947	No.	
Old Colonists' Association Act 1947	No.	
Police Regulation (Amendment) Act 1947	No.	
Public Account Advances (Amendment) Act 1947	No.	
Railway Loan Application Act 1947	No.	
Revocation and Excision of Crown Reservations Act 1947	No.	
Sewerage Districts (Amendment) Act 1947	No.	
Soil Conservation and Land Utilization Act 1947	No.	
Stamps (Increased Duty Continuance) Act 1947	No.	
State Development (Amendment) Act 1947	No.	
State Electricity Commission (Financial) Act 1947	No.	
State Electricity Commission (Yallourn Area) Act 1947	No.	
State Forests Loan and Application Act 1947	No.	
State Savings Bank Act 1947	No.	
Superannuation Act 1947	No.	
Supreme Court (Judges' Salaries) Act 1947	No.	
Transport Regulation (Licences and Fees) Act 1947	No.	
Vegetation Diseases (Fruit Fly) Act 1947	No.	
Water Act 1947	No.	
Water Supply Loan and Application Act 1947	No.	
Wills (Amendment) Act 1947	No.	

== Sources ==
- "1947 Victorian Historical Acts". AustLII.
