= List of acts of the Parliament of Victoria from 1989 =

This is a list of acts of the Parliament of Victoria, Australia for the year 1989.

== 1989 ==
| Short title, or popular name | Citation | Royal assent |
Long title
| Magistrates (Summary Proceedings) (Sheriff) Act 1989 (repealed) | No. 2 of 1989 | 4 April 1989 |
An Act to make provision for the execution of certain warrants by the sheriff, to amend the Magistrates (Summary Proceedings) Act 1975 (Note: Magistrates (Summary Proceedings) Act 1975 (No. 8731)) and for other purposes. (Repealed by Statute Law Revision Act 1995 (No. 11 of 1995))
| Warrnambool Land Act 1989 | No. 3 of 1989 | 26 April 1989 |
An Act to revoke the permanent reservation of certain land and for other purposes.
| Aboriginal Land (Northcote Land) Act 1989 | No. 7 of 1989 | 9 May 1989 |
An Act to authorise the granting by the Crown of certain land at Northcote to the Aborigines Advancement League Incorporated and for other purposes.
| Agricultural Acts (Miscellaneous Amendments) Act 1989 (repealed) | No. 8 of 1989 | 9 May 1989 |
An Act to make certain amendments to the Animal Preparations Act 1987, (Note: Animal Preparations Act 1987 (No. 12 of 1987)) the Dairy Industry Act 1984, (Note: Dairy Industry Act 1984 (No. 10171)) the Dried Fruits Act 1958, (Note: Dried Fruits Act 1958 (No. 6239)) the Fruit and Vegetables Act 1958, (Note: Fruit and Vegetables Act 1958 (No. 6256)) the Seeds Act 1982, (Note: Seeds Act 1982 (No. 9775)) the Vegetation and Vine Diseases Act 1958 (Note: Vegetation and Vine Diseases Act 1958 (No. 6407)) and certain other Acts and for other purposes. (Repealed by Statute Law Revision (Repeals) Act 1999 (No. 3 of 1999))
| Building Control (Amendment) Act 1989 (repealed) | No. 9 of 1989 | 9 May 1989 |
An Act to amend the Building Control Act 1981 (Note: Building Control Act 1981 (No. 9720)) and the Building Control (General Amendment) Act 1988 (Note: Building Control (General Amendment) Act 1988 (No. 12 of 1988)) and for other purposes. (Repealed by Statute Law Revision (Repeals) Act 1999 (No. 3 of 1999))
| Local Government Act 1989 | No. 11 of 1989 | 9 May 1989 |
An Act to reform the law relating to Local Government in Victoria.
| Superannuation (Portability) Act 1989 | No. 14 of 1989 | 9 May 1989 |
An Act to re-enact with amendments the law relating to the portability of superannuation within the public sector, to repeal the Superannuation Benefits Act 1977 (Note: Superannuation Benefits Act 1977 (No. 9017)) and for other purposes.
| Police Regulation (Amendment) Act 1989 (repealed) | No. 15 of 1989 | 16 May 1989 |
An Act to amend the Police Regulation Act 1958, (Note: Police Regulation Act 1958 (No. 6338)) the Ombudsman Act 1973, (Note: Ombudsman Act 1973 (No. 8414)) the Corrections Act 1986, (Note: Corrections Act 1986 (No. 117 of 1986)) the Pensions Supplementation Act 1966 (Note: Pensions Supplementation Act 1966 (No. 7417)) and the Community Services Act 1970 (Note: Social Welfare Act 1970 (No. 8089)) and for other purposes. (Repealed by Legislation Reform (Repeals No. 2) Act 2008 (No. 16 of 2008))
| Supply (1989-90, No. 1) Act 1989 (repealed) | No. 16 of 1989 | 16 May 1989 |
An Act to make interim provision for the appropriation of moneys out of the Consolidated Fund for recurrent services and for certain works and purposes for the financial year 1989-90. (Repealed by Statute Law Revision (Repeals) Act 1999 (No. 3 of 1999))
| Works and Services (Ancillary Provisions, 1989-90, No. 1) Act 1989 (repealed) | No. 17 of 1989 | 16 May 1989 |
An Act to make ancillary provisions for certain works and purposes for the financial year 1989-90. (Repealed by Statute Law Revision (Repeals) Act 1999 (No. 3 of 1999))
| Transfer of Land (Computer Register) Act 1989 (repealed) | No. 18 of 1989 | 16 May 1989 |
An Act to amend the Transfer of Land Act 1958 (Note: Transfer of Land Act 1958 (No. 6399)) concerning the automation of the Land Titles Register and other matters, to make consequential amendments to various Acts and for other purposes. (Repealed by Legislation Reform (Repeals No. 2) Act 2008 (No. 16 of 2008))
| Constitution (Supreme Court) Act 1989 | No. 22 of 1989 | 2 June 1989 |
An Act to amend Part III of the Constitution Act 1975 (Note: Constitution Act 1975 (No. 8750)) and for other purposes.
| Cancer (Central Registers) Act 1989 (repealed) | No. 23 of 1989 | 6 June 1989 |
An Act to amend the Cancer Act 1958 (Note: Cancer Act 1958 (No. 6213)) and for other purposes. (Repealed by Statute Law Revision Act 1995 (No. 11 of 1995))
| Credit (Amendment) Act 1989 (repealed) | No. 24 of 1989 | 6 June 1989 |
An Act to amend the Credit Act 1984 (Note: Credit Act 1984 (No. 10097)) and the Credit (Administration) Act 1984 (Note: Credit (Administration) Act 1984 (No. 10091)) and for other purposes. (Repealed by Legislation Reform (Repeals No. 2) Act 2008 (No. 16 of 2008))
| Dairy Industry (Amendment) Act 1989 (repealed) | No. 26 of 1989 | 6 June 1989 |
An Act to amend the Dairy Industry Act 1984. (Repealed by Statute Law Revision (Repeals) Act 1999 (No. 3 of 1999))
| Education Acts (Overseas Students) Act 1989 (repealed) | No. 27 of 1989 | 6 June 1989 |
An Act to amend the Education Act 1958 (Note: Education Act 1958 (No. 6240)) and the Post-Secondary Education Act 1978 (Note: Post-Secondary Education Act 1978 (No. 9145)) and for other purposes. (Repealed by Statute Law Revision Act 1995 (No. 11 of 1995))
| Estate Agents (Amendment) Act 1989 (repealed) | No. 29 of 1989 | 6 June 1989 |
An Act to make miscellaneous amendments to the Estate Agents Act 1980 (Note: Estate Agents Act 1980 (No. 9428)) and for other purposes. (Repealed by Legislation Reform (Repeals No. 2) Act 2008 (No. 16 of 2008))
| Environment Protection (Ozone Layer) Act 1989 (repealed) | No. 30 of 1989 | 6 June 1989 |
An Act to amend the Environment Protection Act 1970, (Note: Environment Protection Act 1970 (No. 8056)) to control the manufacture, sale, use and disposal of ozone-depleting substances and for other purposes. (Repealed by Statute Law Revision Act 1995 (No. 11 of 1995))
| Frankston Lands Act 1989 | No. 32 of 1989 | 6 June 1989 |
An Act to revoke the permanent reservation of certain lands at Frankston and for other purposes.
| Land (Miscellaneous Matters) Act 1989 | No. 34 of 1989 | 6 June 1989 |
An Act to revoke the permanent reservations and Crown Grants of certain lands, to add certain lands to lands permanently reserved, to amend the Kew and Heidelberg Lands Act 1933, (Note: Kew and Heidelberg Lands Act 1933 (No. 4194)) the Kew and Heidelberg Lands Act 1958 (Note: Kew and Heidelberg Lands Act 1958 (No. 6425)) and the Melbourne Lands Act 1987, (Note: Melbourne Lands Act 1987 (No. 77 of 1987)) to repeal the Moolap Salt Works Act 1896 (Note: Moolap Salt Works Act 1896 (60 Vict. No. 1411)) and the Wangaratta Lands Act 1933 (Note: Wangaratta Lands Act 1933 (No. 4121)) and for other purposes.
| National Parks (Alpine National Park) Act 1989 (repealed) | No. 37 of 1989 | 6 June 1989 |
An Act to amend the National Parks Act 1975 (Note: National Parks Act 1975 (No. 8702)) to provide for an Alpine National Park and for other purposes. (Repealed by Legislation Reform (Repeals No. 2) Act 2008 (No. 16 of 2008))
| National Parks (Amendment) Act 1989 | No. 38 of 1989 | 6 June 1989 |
A to make amendments to the National Parks Act 1975 and for other purposes.
| Prescribed Weapons Act 1989 | No. 39 of 1989 | 6 June 1989 |
An Act to amend the Firearms Act 1958 (Note: Firearms Act 1958 (No. 6251)) to prohibit prescribed weapons, to change the short title of the Firearms Act 1958 and for other purposes.
| Racing (Amendment) Act 1989 (repealed) | No. 41 of 1989 | 6 June 1989 |
An Act to amend the Racing Act 1958 (Note: Racing Act 1958 (No. 6353)) and for other purposes. (Repealed by Statute Law Revision Act 1995 (No. 11 of 1995))
| Trustee (Amendment) Act 1989 | No. 45 of 1989 | 6 June 1989 |
An Act to authorise trustee investment in the Australian Telecommunications Corporation (Note: Australian Telecommunications Commission, trading as Telecom Australia.) and for other purposes.
| Wheat Marketing Act 1989 | No. 46 of 1989 | 6 June 1989 |
An Act relating to the marketing of wheat, to repeal the Wheat Marketing Act 1984 (Note: Wheat Marketing Act 1984 (No. 10162)) and for other purposes.
| Egg Industry Act 1989 | No. 49 of 1989 | 14 June 1989 |
An Act to re-enact with amendments provisions applicable to the egg industry, to repeal the Egg Industry Stabilization Act 1983 (Note: Egg Industry Stabilization Act 1983 (No. 10024)) and the Poultry Levy (Collection Arrangement) Act 1965, (Note: Poultry Levy (Collection Arrangement) Act 1965 (No. 7341)) to amend the Marketing of Primary Products Act 1958 (Note: Marketing of Primary Products Act 1958 (No. 6304)) and the Borrowing and Investment Powers Act 1987, (Note: Borrowing and Investment Powers Act 1987 (No. 13 of 1987)) and for other purposes.
| Fire Authorities Act 1989 | No. 50 of 1989 | 14 June 1989 |
An Act to make miscellaneous amendments to the Country Fire Authority Act 1958, (Note: Country Fire Authority Act 1958 (No. 6228)) the Emergency Management Act 1986, (Note: Emergency Management Act 1986 (No. 30 of 1986)) the Metropolitan Fire Brigades Act 1958, (Note: Metropolitan Fire Brigades Act 1958 (No. 6315)) the Summary Offences Act 1966, (Note: Summary Offences Act 1966 (No. 7405)) the Transport Accident Act 1986 (Note: Transport Accident Act 1986 (No. 111 of 1986)) and the Victoria State Emergency Service Act 1987 (Note: Victoria State Emergency Service Act 1987 (No. 57 of 1987)) and for other purposes.
| Magistrates' Court Act 1989 | No. 51 of 1989 | 14 June 1989 |
An Act to establish the Magistrates' Court of Victoria, to provide for the constitution, jurisdiction and proceedings of that Court, to repeal the Magistrates' Courts Act 1971 (Note: Magistrates' Courts Act 1971 (No. 8184)) and the Magistrates (Summary Proceedings) Act 1975, to amend the Bail Act 1977, (Note: Bail Act 1977 (No. 9008)) the Crimes Act 1958, (Note: Crimes Act 1958 (No. 6231)) the Evidence Act 1958, (Note: Evidence Act 1958 (No. 6246)) the Interpretation of Legislation Act 1984 (Note: Interpretation of Legislation Act 1984 (No. 10096)) and certain other Acts and for other purposes.
| Second-Hand Dealers and Pawnbrokers Act 1989 | No. 54 of 1989 | 14 June 1989 |
An Act to provide for the licensing and regulation of second-hand dealers and pawnbrokers and to facilitate and expedite the recovery of stolen goods from second-hand dealers and pawnbrokers; to repeal the Second-hand Dealers Act 1958, (Note: Second-hand Dealers Act 1958 (No. 6363)) the Pawnbrokers Act 1958 (Note: Pawnbrokers Act 1958 (No. 6332)) and the Marine Stores and Old Metals Act 1958; (Note: Marine Stores and Old Metals Act 1958 (No. 6303)) to amend the Goods Act 1958; (Note: Goods Act 1958 (No. 6265)) to make other consequential amendments and repeals; and for other purposes.
| Valuation of Land (Amendment) Act 1989 (repealed) | No. 55 of 1989 | 14 June 1989 |
An Act to transfer the valuation provisions of the Local Government Act 1958 (Note: Local Government Act 1958 (No. 6299)) to the Valuation of Land Act 1960, (Note: Valuation of Land Act 1960 (No. 6653)) to amend the Local Government Act 1958, the Valuation of Land Act 1960 and for other purposes. (Repealed by Legislation Reform (Repeals No. 2) Act 2008 (No. 16 of 2008))
| Children and Young Persons Act 1989 (repealed) | No. 56 of 1989 | 14 June 1989 |
An Act to establish The Children's Court of Victoria, to provide for the constitution, jurisdiction and proceedings of that Court, to make fresh provision in relation to the protection of children and in relation to children who have been charged with, or who have been found guilty of, offences, to repeal the Children's Court Act 1973, (Note: Children's Court Act 1973 (No. 8477)) to amend the Community Welfare Services Act 1970 (Note: Social Welfare Act 1970 (No. 8089)) and various other Acts and for other purposes. (Repealed by Children, Youth and Families Act 2005 (No. 96 of 2005))
| Legal Aid Commission (Amendment) Act 1989 (repealed) | No. 61 of 1989 | 12 September 1989 |
An Act to amend the Legal Aid Commission Act 1978 (Note: Legal Aid Commission Act 1978 (No. 9245)) and for other purposes. (Repealed by Statute Law Repeals Act 2012 (No. 30 of 2012))
| Murray Valley Citrus Marketing Act 1989 | No. 63 of 1989 | 19 September 1989 |
An Act to make provision for a joint Victorian and New South Wales scheme for marketing citrus fruit and for other purposes.
| Appropriation (1989-90, No. 1) Act 1989 | No. 65 of 1989 | 31 October 1989 |
| Works and Services (Ancillary Provisions, 1989-90, No. 2) Act 1989 (repealed) | No. 66 of 1989 | 31 October 1989 |
An Act to make further ancillary provisions for certain works and purposes for the financial year 1989-90. (Repealed by Statute Law Revision (Repeals) Act 1999 (No. 3 of 1999))
| Melbourne Cricket Ground Trust Act 1989 | No. 70 of 1989 | 28 November 1989 |
An Act to incorporate the trustees of the Melbourne Cricket Ground and for other purposes.
| Racing (TAB Surplus) Act 1989 (repealed) | No. 71 of 1989 | 28 November 1989 |
An Act to amend Part V of the Racing Act 1958 and for other purposes. (Repealed by Statute Law Revision Act 1995 (No. 11 of 1995))
| Agriculture Acts (General Amendment) Act 1989 (repealed) | No. 72 of 1989 | 28 November 1989 |
An Act to amend the Wheat Marketing Act 1989, (Note: Wheat Marketing Act 1989 (No. 46 of 1989)) the Dried Fruits Act 1958 and other Acts, to repeal other Acts and for other purposes. (Repealed by Statute Law Revision (Repeals) Act 1999 (No. 3 of 1999))
| Very Fast Train (Route Investigation) Act 1989 | No. 77 of 1989 | 28 November 1989 |
An Act to facilitate the investigation of a route for a very fast train and for other purposes.
| Chiropodists (Amendment) Act 1989 (repealed) | No. 79 of 1989 | 28 November 1989 |
An Act to amend the Chiropodists Act 1968 (Note: Chiropodists Act 1968 (No. 7765)) and for other purposes. (Repealed by Statute Law Revision (Repeals) Act 1999 (No. 3 of 1999))
| Water Act 1989 | No. 80 of 1989 | 5 December 1989 |
An Act to re-state, with amendments, the law relating to water in Victoria, to repeal the Dandenong Valley Authority Act 1963, (Note: Dandenong Valley Authority Act 1963 (No. 7060)) the Drainage of Land Act 1975, (Note: Drainage of Land Act 1975 (No. 8811)) the Geelong Waterworks and Sewerage Act 1958, (Note: Geelong Waterworks and Sewerage Act 1958 (No. 6263)) the Groundwater Act 1969, (Note: Groundwater Act 1969 (No. 7849)) the Latrobe Valley Act 1958, (Note: Latrobe Valley Act 1958 (No. 6290)) the Mildura Irrigation Trusts and Sunraysia Water Board Act 1958, (Note: Mildura Irrigation and Water Trusts Act 1958 (No. 6316)) the River Improvement Act 1958, (Note: River Improvement Act 1958 (No. 6358)) the Sewerage Districts Act 1958, (Note: Sewerage Districts Act 1958 (No. 6368)) the Victorian Water and Sewerage Authorities Association Act 1981, (Note: Victorian Water and Sewerage Authorities Association Act 1981 (No. 9701)) the Water Act 1958, (Note: Water Act 1958 (No. 6413)) the West Moorabool Water Board Act 1968 (Note: West Moorabool Water Board Act 1968 (No. 7698)) and certain other Acts, to amend the Land Act 1958 (Note: Land Act 1958 (No. 6284)) and for other purposes
| Water (Consequential Amendments) Act 1989 (repealed) | No. 81 of 1989 | 5 December 1989 |
An Act to amend various Acts as a consequence of the enactment of the Water Act 1989. (Note: Water Act 1989 (No. 80 of 1989)) (Repealed by Statute Law Revision (Repeals) Act 1999 (No. 3 of 1999))
| Crimes (Blood Samples) Act 1989 | No. 84 of 1989 | 5 December 1989 |
An Act to amend the Crimes Act 1958 to permit the taking of blood samples by consent or upon the order of a court from persons suspected of having committed certain offences and for other related purposes.
| Bayside Project (Amendment) Act 1989 (repealed) | No. 85 of 1989 | 5 December 1989 |
An Act to amend the Bayside Project Act 1988 (Note: Bayside Project Act 1988 (No. 67 of 1988)) and for other purposes. (Repealed by Legislation Reform (Repeals No. 3) Act 2008 (No. 53 of 2008))
| Environment Protection (General Amendment) Act 1989 | No. 87 of 1989 | 5 December 1989 |
An Act to amend the Environment Protection Act 1970, the Health (General Amendment) Act 1988 (Note: Health (General Amendment) Act 1988 (No. 48 of 1988)) and the Litter Act 1987. (Note: Litter Act 1987 (No. 54 of 1987))
| Conservation, Forests and Lands Acts (Amendment) Act 1989 (repealed) | No. 90 of 1989 | 5 December 1989 |
An Act to amend the Conservation, Forests and Lands Act 1987, (Note: Conservation, Forests and Lands Act 1987 (No. 41 of 1987)) the Land Act 1958, the Forests Act 1958, (Note: Forests Act 1958 (No. 6254)) the Firearms Act 1958 and the Wildlife Act 1975 (Note: Wildlife Act 1975 (No. 8699)) and for other purposes. (Repealed by Statute Law Revision (Repeals) Act 1999 (No. 3 of 1999))
| Fire Authorities (Contributions) Act 1989 (repealed) | No. 91 of 1989 | 5 December 1989 |
An Act to amend the Country Fire Authority Act 1958, the Metropolitan Fire Brigades Act 1958 and the Fire Authorities Act 1989 (Note: Fire Authorities Act 1989 (No. 50 of 1989)) and for other purposes. (Repealed by Legislation Reform (Repeals No. 2) Act 2008 (No. 16 of 2008))
| Accident Compensation (General Amendment) Act 1989 | No. X of 1989 | |
| Adoption (Amendment) Act 1989 | No. X of 1989 | |
| Business Franchise (Tobacco) (Amendment) Act 1989 | No. X of 1989 | |
| Caravan Parks and Movable Dwellings (Amendment) Act 1989 | No. X of 1989 | |
| Co-operative Housing Societies (Amendment) Act 1989 | No. X of 1989 | |
| County Court (Amendment) Act 1989 | No. X of 1989 | |
| Credit (Administration) (Amendment) Act 1989 | No. X of 1989 | |
| Crimes Legislation (Miscellaneous Amendments) Act 1989 | No. X of 1989 | |
| Dangerous Goods (Amendment) Act 1989 | No. X of 1989 | |
| Education (Work Experience) Act 1989 | No. X of 1989 | |
| Extractive Industries (Amendment) Act 1989 | No. X of 1989 | |
| Financial Institutions Duty (Amendment) Act 1989 | No. X of 1989 | |
| Fisheries (Amendment) Act 1989 | No. X of 1989 | |
| Forests (Laminex Industries Agreement) Act 1989 | No. X of 1989 | |
| Forests (Victree Forests Agreement) Act 1989 | No. X of 1989 | |
| Guardianship and Administration Board (Amendment) Act 1989 | No. X of 1989 | |
| Health (General Amendment) (Amendment) Act 1989 | No. X of 1989 | |
| Health Acts (Amendment) Act 1989 | No. X of 1989 | |
| Historic Buildings (Amendment) Act 1989 | No. X of 1989 | |
| House Contracts Guarantee (Amendment) Act 1989 | No. X of 1989 | |
| Intellectually Disabled Persons' Services (Amendment) Act 1989 | No. X of 1989 | |
| Legal Profession Practice (Amendment) Act 1989 | No. X of 1989 | |
| Licensing Authorities (Amendment) Act 1989 | No. X of 1989 | |
| Limitation of Actions (Amendment) Act 1989 | No. X of 1989 | |
| Local Government (Consequential Provisions) Act 1989 | No. X of 1989 | |
| Magistrates' Court (Consequential Amendments) Act 1989 | No. X of 1989 | |
| Martial Arts Control (Amendment) Act 1989 | No. X of 1989 | |
| Melbourne and Metropolitan Board of Works (Amendment) Act 1989 | No. X of 1989 | |
| Ombudsman (Amendment) Act 1989 | No. X of 1989 | |
| Parliamentary Committees (Amendment) Act 1989 | No. X of 1989 | |
| Penalty Interest Rates (Amendment) Act 1989 | No. X of 1989 | |
| Planning and Environment (Amendment) Act 1989 | No. X of 1989 | |
| Port of Melbourne Authority (Amendment) Act 1989 | No. X of 1989 | |
| Public Authorities (Contributions) (Amendment) Act 1989 | No. X of 1989 | |
| Public Service (Amendment) Act 1989 | No. X of 1989 | |
| Road Safety (Miscellaneous Amendments) Act 1989 | No. X of 1989 | |
| Sale of Land (Amendment) Act 1989 | No. X of 1989 | |
| Small Claims Tribunals (Amendment) Act 1989 | No. X of 1989 | |
| Stamps (Motor Vehicles) Act 1989 | No. X of 1989 | |
| State Casual Employees Superannuation Act 1989 | No. X of 1989 | |
| State Insurance Office (Amendment) Act 1989 | No. X of 1989 | |
| Subdivision (Amendment) Act 1989 | No. X of 1989 | |
| Subdivision (Further Amendment) Act 1989 | No. X of 1989 | |
| Transport (Amendment) Act 1989 | No. X of 1989 | |

== Sources ==
- "1989 Victorian Historical Acts". AustLII.
