= List of acts of the Parliament of Victoria from 1930 =

This is a list of acts of the Parliament of Victoria, Australia for the year 1930.

== 1930 ==
Short title, or popular name	Citation	Royal assent
Long title
	No. 3853	7 January 1930
An Act to apply a sum out of the Consolidated Revenue to the service of the year ending on the thirtieth day of June One thousand nine hundred and thirty and to appropriate the Supplies granted in this and the last preceding Session of Parliament.
Local Government (Railway Agreements) Act 1930	No. 3856	6 May 1930
An Act to enable the Councils of Municipalities to enter into Agreements with The Victorian Railways Commissioners in certain cases.
Ballaarat Lands Act 1930 (repealed)	No. 3859	12 May 1930
An Act to provide for the Revocation of the Reservation of certain Lands at Ballaarat reserved as a Site for and used by the Ballaarat Agricultural and Pastoral Society for Show Yards, the Revocation of the Crown grant of portion thereof, the Transfer to the Crown of certain Lands held by Trustees for the said Society, the Closing of portion of a Street in the City of Ballaarat, the Subdivision and Sale by the Board of Land and Works of part of the Lands aforesaid and of the Land forming the portion so closed of the said Street, the Application of the Proceeds of such Sale, the Re-alignment of the Street aforesaid, and the Transfer to the Crown of certain other Lands to be reserved for Show Yards and Public Recreation, and for other purposes. (Repealed by Statute Law Revision Act 1984 (No. 10087))
Narree Worran Land Act 1930 (repealed)	No. 3860	20 May 1930
An Act to revoke the Permanent Reservation of [Portions of certain Land in the Parish of Narre Worran as a Site for Police Purposes and to provide for the Permanent Reservation for Public Purposes of such Portions of the said Land and the Grant of Grazing Licences in respect of Part of the said Land. (Repealed by Statute Law Revision Act 1984 (No. 10087))
Totalizator Act 1930	No. 3861	20 May 1930
An Act relating to Totalizators on Race-courses.
Meringur to Morkalla Railway Construction Act 1930	No. 3862	27 May 1930
An Act to authorize the Construction by the State of a Line of Railway from Meringur to Morkalla.
Wheat Advances Arrangements Act 1930 (repealed)	No. 3863	2 June 1930
An Act to enable the Treasurer of Victoria to enter into Arrangements with Banks respecting Advances to Cultivators of Land for the purpose of enabling them to sow additional Areas of Land with Wheat during the year One thousand nine hundred and thirty, and for other purposes. (Repealed by Statute Law Revision Act 1995 (No. 11 of 1995))
	No. 3867	2 June 1930
An Act to apply out of the Consolidated Revenue the sum of One million five hundred and forty-five thousand one hundred and seventy-five pounds to the service of the year One thousand nine hundred and thirty and One thousand nine hundred and thirty-one.
	No. 3869	31 July 1930
An Act to apply out of the Consolidated Revenue the sum of One million four hundred and seven thousand five hundred and eighty-one pounds to the service of the year One thousand nine hundred and thirty and One thousand nine hundred and thirty-one.
	No. 3870	19 August 1930
An Act to apply out of the Consolidated Revenue the sum of One hundred and seventy-three thousand two hundred and sixty-eight pounds to the service of the year One thousand nine hundred and twenty-nine and One thousand nine hundred and thirty.
	No. 3871	4 September 1930
An Act to apply out of the Consolidated Revenue the sum of One million four hundred and nine thousand nine hundred and sixty-three pounds to the service of the year One thousand nine hundred and thirty and One thousand nine hundred and thirty-one.
Victoria Racing Club Act 1930	No. 3875	8 October 1930
An Act to amend Section Twenty-six of The Victoria Racing Club Act 1871 (Note: Victoria Racing Club Act 1871 (35 Vict. No. 398)) and for other purposes.
	No. 3876	8 October 1930
An Act to apply out of the Consolidated Revenue the sum of One million two hundred and twenty-seven thousand five hundred and seventy-three pounds to the service of the year One thousand nine hundred and thirty and One thousand nine hundred and thirty-one.
Oakleigh Land (Mechanics' Institute) Act 1930	No. 3878	28 October 1930
An Act to revoke the Reservation of certain Land in the City of Oakleigh permanently reserved as a Site for a Mechanics' Institute and Free Library and to provide for the Transfer and Surrender to His Majesty of that Land and of certain other Land in the said City and for the Reservation of the said Lands for Municipal purposes and the Grant thereof to the Mayor Councillors and Citizens of the said City.
	No. 3884	6 November 1930
An Act to apply out of the Consolidated Revenue the sum of One million three hundred and twenty-five thousand six hundred and forty pounds to the service of the year One thousand nine hundred and thirty and One thousand nine hundred and thirty-one.
Yarrawonga Land Act 1930 (repealed)	No. 3885	18 November 1930
An Act to provide for the Transfer to His Majesty of certain Lands at Yarrawonga and the permanent Reservation and Grant to the President Councillors and Ratepayers of the Shire of Yarrawonga of such Lands as a Site for Municipal Buildings and a Mechanics' Institute and Free Library and for other purposes. (Repealed by Statute Law Revision Act 1995 (No. 11 of 1995))
Wonthaggi Land Act 1930 (repealed)	No. 3886	18 November 1930
An Act relating to the Acquisition for the purposes of the State Coal Mine of certain Lands at Wonthaggi and the Purchase by The Victorian Railways Commissioners of certain Crown Lands at Wonthaggi and the Transfer to Owners of the first-mentioned Lands of portions of the Lands so purchased and the Sale of the remainder thereof. (Repealed by Statute Law Revision Act 1984 (No. 10087))
Oddfellows Hall (Melbourne) Land Act 1930	No. 3887	18 November 1930
An Act relating to certain Land in the City of Melbourne permanently reserved as a Site for Oddfellows Asylum and Hall.
Finance Act 1930	No. 3889	1 December 1930
An Act to make provision with respect to Public Finance and other matters.
Ararat Land Act 1930	No. 3891	1 December 1930
An Act to provide for the Purchase of certain Lands situate in the Town of Ararat from the Crown by The Victorian Railways Commissioners and the Issue of a Crown Grant of the said Lands to the said Commissioners.
Club Tivoli Registration Act 1930	No. 3894	9 December 1930
An Act to make provision with respect to the Registration under Part XII. of the Licensing Act 1928 (Note: Licensing Act 1928 (19 Geo. V. No. 3717)) of a Club known as the Club Tivoli.
Local Government (Breadth of Highways) Act 1930	No. 3895	9 December 1930
An Act to amend Section Five hundred and nineteen of the Local Government Act 1928. (Note: Local Government Act 1928 (19 Geo. V. No. 3720))
Salvation Army (Victoria) Property Trust Act 1930	No. 3896	18 December 1930
An Act to provide for the Temporal Affairs of The Salvation Army in the State of Victoria.
Motor Car Act 1930	No. 3901	18 December 1930
An Act to amend the Motor Car Act 1928 (Note: Motor Car Act 1928 (19 Geo. V. No. 3741)) and for other purposes.
Baptist Union Incorporation Act 1930	No. 3903	24 December 1930
An Act to incorporate The Baptist Union of Victoria and for other purposes.
Local Government (Commonwealth Loans) Act 1930	No. 3910	24 December 1930
An Act to enable Municipalities to invest in Commonwealth Loans.
Lord Mayor's Fund Act 1930	No. 3915	24 December 1930
An Act to incorporate the President and Council of the Lord Mayor's Fund for Metropolitan Hospitals and Charities and to provide for the Management of the Fund and for other purposes.
Queenscliffe Land Act 1930 (repealed)	No. 3919	31 December 1930
An Act to provide for the Revocation of the Reservation of certain Crown Lands in the Borough of Queenscliffe and the Closing of Portions of certain Streets in the said Borough and for the Reservation as a Public Park and for the Recreation of the People and for public purposes respectively of Parts of the said Crown Lands and of the Lands forming Portions of the Streets so closed. (Repealed by Statute Law Revision Act 1984 (No. 10087))
Acts Interpretation Act 1930	No. 3930	31 December 1930
An Act relating to the Interpretation of Legislative Enactments.
South Australian and Victorian Border Railways Act 1930	No. 3932	31 December 1930
An Act to approve and ratify and provide for carrying out an Agreement relating to the Working of certain Border Railways, and purposes incidental thereto, entered into between the Governments of the States of Victoria and South Australia, and for other purposes.
Melbourne Electric Supply Company Act 1930	No. 3935	31 December 1930
An Act to ratify and validate certain Agreements relating to Undertakings of The Melbourne Electric Supply Company Limited and to amend The Melbourne Electric Supply Company Act 1924 (Note: Melbourne Electric Supply Company Act 1924 (15 Geo. V. No. 3377)) and for other purposes.
Victorian Government Special Inscribed Stock Act 1930 (repealed)	No. 3937	31 December 1930
An Act to amend the Victorian Government Special Inscribed Stock Act 1910 (Note: Victorian Government Special Inscribed Stock Act 1910 (1 Geo. V. No. 2308)) and for other purposes. (Repealed by Treasury Legislation (Repeal) Act 2005 (No. 73 of 2005))
University Act Amendment Act 1930	No. 3942	31 December 1930
An Act to make provision with respect to the University Students Loan Fund under the University Act 1928 (Note: University Act 1928 (19 Geo. V. No. 3795)) and the Granting of Moneys from the Consolidated Revenue to the University of Melbourne for the purposes of or in connexion with a Veterinary Research Institute.
Statute Law Revision Act 1930	No. 3943	31 December 1930
An Act to revise the Statute Law and for other purposes.
	No. 3949	31 December 1930
An Act to apply a sum out of the Consolidated Revenue to the service of the year ending on the thirtieth day of June One thousand nine hundred and thirty-one and to appropriate the Supplies granted in this Session of Parliament.
Births Notification Act 1930	No.	
Blackburn and Mitcham Loan Act 1930	No.	
Boort Land Act 1930	No.	
Brighton Town Relief Fund Act 1930	No.	
Business Agents Act 1930	No.	
Cattle Compensation Act 1930	No.	
Caulfield Loan Act 1930	No.	
Cemeteries Act 1930	No.	
Closer Settlement (Financial) Act 1930	No.	
Coburg Loan Act 1930	No.	
Colongulac Land Act 1930	No.	
Country Roads Board Fund Act 1930	No.	
Cultivation Advances Act 1930	No.	
Developmental Railways Act 1930	No.	
Fees (Jury Cases) Act 1930	No.	
Forests Act 1930	No.	
Game Act 1930	No.	
Geelong Harbor Trust Act 1930	No.	
Gritjurk Land Act 1930	No.	
Hawkers and Pedlers Act 1930	No.	
Income Tax Act 1930	No.	
Kaniva Land Act 1930	No.	
Licensing Fund Act 1930	No.	
Mansfield Land Act 1930	No.	
Melbourne and Metropolitan Board of Works Lands Act 1930	No.	
Melbourne and Metropolitan Tramways Act 1930	No.	
Melbourne and Metropolitan Tramways Board Act 1930	No.	
Melbourne Harbor Trust (Overdraft) Act 1930	No.	
Mornington Land Act 1930	No.	
Morwell Land Act 1930	No.	
Municipal Endowment (Temporary Discontinuance) Act 1930	No.	
Oakleigh Loan Act 1930	No.	
Officers of the Department of Agriculture Act 1930	No.	
Poisons Act 1930	No.	
Preston Loan Act 1930	No.	
Public Authorities Marks Act 1930	No.	
Public Service Payments Reduction Act 1930	No.	
Railway Loan Application Act 1930	No.	
Real Estate Agents Act 1930	No.	
Sewerage Authorities (Borrowing) Act 1930	No.	
Special and Other Appropriations Reduction Act 1930	No.	
Special Funds (Teachers' Residences) Act 1930	No.	
Stamps (Bookmakers Licenses) Act 1930	No.	
Stamps (Increased Duty Continuance) Act 1930	No.	
Stamps (Unemployment Relief) Act 1930	No.	
State Electricity Commission (Funds and Accounts) Act 1930	No.	
Superannuation Act 1930	No.	
Swine Act 1930	No.	
Treasury Bonds Act 1930	No.	
Treasury Overdrafts Act 1930	No.	
Unemployment Relief Act 1930	No.	
Unemployment Relief Amendment Act 1930	No.	
Victorian Congregational Building Association Incorporation Act 1930	No.	
Victorian Government Loan (Debentures) Act 1930	No.	
Victorian Loan (Country Sewerage) Act 1930	No.	
Victorian Loan (Electricity Supply) and Application Act 1930	No.	
Victorian Loan (State Forests) Act 1930	No.	
Wangaratta Church of England Land Act 1930	No.	
Water Supply Loans Application Act 1930	No.	
Wild Flowers and Native Plants Protection Act 1930	No.	
Workers' Compensation (Insurance and Reserve Funds) Act 1930	No.	

== Sources ==
- "1930 Victorian Historical Acts". AustLII.
