= List of acts of the Parliament of Victoria from 1945 =

This is a list of acts of the Parliament of Victoria, Australia for the year 1945.

== 1945 ==
Short title, or popular name	Citation	Royal assent
Long title
Oakleigh (Regent-street) Land Act 1945	No. 5061	19 June 1945
An Act to provide for the Closing of Portion of a Street known as Regent-street in the City of Oakleigh, the Vesting in His Majesty of the Land upon which the said Portion is set out and the Grant of the said Land to the Owner of the Land adjoining the said Land.
Unclaimed Moneys Act 1945	No. 5064	19 June 1945
An Act to provide for the Payment into the Consolidated Revenue of Unclaimed Moneys in Court, and for other purposes.
	No. 5065	19 June 1945
An Act to apply out of the Consolidated Revenue the sum of One million nine hundred and eighty thousand three hundred and eighty-seven pounds to the service of the year One thousand nine hundred and forty-five and One thousand nine hundred and forty-six.
	No. 5066	1 August 1945
An Act to apply out of the Consolidated Revenue the sum of Three million nine hundred and seventy thousand nine hundred and thirty-seven pounds to the service of the year One thousand nine hundred and forty-five and One thousand nine hundred and forty-six.
Agent-General's Act 1945	No. 5067	7 August 1945
An Act to consolidate and amend the Law relating to the Agent-General for Victoria.
Water Act 1945	No. 5072	28 August 1945
An Act to reduce the Capital Liability of certain Waterworks Trusts and Local Governing Bodie, to amend the Water Acts, and for other purposes.
National Security (Repeal) Act 1945	No. 5073	6 September 1945
An Act to repeal the National Security (Emergency Powers) Acts, and for other purposes.
Lilydale Waterworks Trust Abolition Act 1945 (repealed)	No. 5076	24 September 1945
An Act to provide for the Abolition of the Lilydale Waterworks Trust, and for other purposes. (Repealed by Statute Law Revision Act 1984 (No. 10087))
Bendigo Land Act 1945 (repealed)	No. 5081	2 October 1945
An Act to provide for the Revocation of the Reservation as a site for Market Purposes of certain Lands in the Parish of Sandhurst and for the Revocation of the Crown Grant thereof to the Mayor Councillors and Citizens of the City of Sandhurst and for the Crown Grant of such Lands to the Country Roads Board, and for other purposes. (Repealed by Statute Law Revision Act 1984 (No. 10087))
	No. 5082	2 October 1945
An Act to apply out of the Consolidated Revenue the sum of Four million one hundred and fourteen thousand four hundred and ninety pounds to the service of the year One thousand nine hundred and forty-five and One thousand nine hundred and forty-six.
	No. 5083	30 November 1945
An Act to apply out of the Consolidated Revenue the sum of Two million and seventy-six thousand and seventeen pounds to the service of the year One thousand nine hundred and forty-five and One thousand nine hundred and forty-six.
	No. 5084	30 November 1945
An Act to apply out of the Consolidated Revenue the sum of Nine hundred and seventy-seven thousand four hundred and eighty-three pounds to the service of the year One thousand nine hundred and forty-four and One thousand nine hundred and forty-five.
Administration and Probate Duties Act 1945	No. 5086	13 December 1945
An Act to continue the Operation of Part III. of the Finance Act 1930. (Note: Finance Act 1930 (No. 3889))
Employers and Employés Act 1945 or the Employers and Employees Act 1945	No. 5090	21 December 1945
An Act to amend the Law relating to Employers and Employés.
University (Veterinary Research) Act 1945	No. 5092	21 December 1945
An Act to make provision with respect to the Granting of Moneys from the Consolidated Revenue to the University of Melbourne for the purposes of or in connexion with the Veterinary Research Institute.
Water Supply Loan Application Act 1945	No. 5099	21 December 1945
An Act to sanction the Issue and Application of certain Sums of Money available under Loan Acts or in the State Loans Repayment Fund for Irrigation Works Water Supply Works Drainage and Flood Protection Works in Country Districts and for Works under the River Murray Waters Acts, and for other purposes.
Soldier Settlement Act 1945	No. 5107	28 December 1945
An Act to ratify the Execution for and on behalf of the State of Victoria of an Agreement between the said State and the Commonwealth of Australia in relation to Soldier Settlement and to approve the Agreement so executed, to constitute a Soldier Settlement Commission and to confer certain Powers and Functions upon the said Commission, and for other purposes.
	No. 5108	28 December 1945
An Act to apply a sum out of the Consolidated Revenue to the service of the year ending on the thirtieth day of June One thousand nine hundred and forty-six and to appropriate the Supplies granted in this and the last preceding Session of Parliament.
Coal Mines Regulation (Amendment) Act 1945	No.	
Country Roads Board Fund (Amendment) Act 1945	No.	
Drought Relief (Amendment) Act 1945	No.	
East Melbourne Land Act 1945	No.	
Education Act 1945	No.	
Factories and Shops (Bread Holidays) Act 1945	No.	
Farmers Advances Act 1945	No.	
Farmers Protection (Amendment) Act 1945	No.	
Financial Emergency (Municipal Endowment) Act 1945	No.	
Health (Wines) Act 1945	No.	
Hospital Benefits Act 1945	No.	
Land Surveyors (Amendment) Act 1945	No.	
Land Tax Act 1945	No.	
Law Institute Act 1945	No.	
Licensing (Poll) Act 1945	No.	
Licensing Fund Act 1945	No.	
Local Government (Emergency Housing Accommodation) Act 1945	No.	
Melbourne and Metropolitan Board of Works (Borrowing Powers) Act 1945	No.	
Melbourne and Metropolitan Tramways (Chairman) Act 1945	No.	
Mildura Irrigation and Water Trusts (Borrowing) Act 1945	No.	
Mines (Amendment) Act 1945	No.	
Moorabbin (Unimproved Rating Poll) Act 1945	No.	
Public Account Advances (Amendment) Act 1945	No.	
Public Works Loan and Application Act 1945	No.	
Railway Loan Application Act 1945	No.	
Stamps (Increased Duty Continuance) Act 1945	No.	
State Development Act 1945	No.	
State Forests Loan and Application Act 1945	No.	
Supreme Court (Judges) Act 1945	No.	
Surplus Revenue Act 1945	No.	
Swine Act 1945	No.	
Totalizator (Amendment) Act 1945	No.	

== Sources ==
- "1945 Victorian Historical Acts". AustLII.
