= List of acts of the Parliament of Victoria from 1918 =

This is a list of acts of the Parliament of Victoria, Australia for the year 1918.

== 1918 ==
Short title, or popular name	Citation	Royal assent
Long title
	8 Geo. V. No. 2931	13 February 1918
An Act to apply out of the Consolidated Revenue the sum of Six hundred and fifty-one thousand five hundred and ninety-one pounds to the service of the year One thousand nine hundred and seventeen and One thousand nine hundred and eighteen.
	8 Geo. V. No. 2932	13 March 1918
An Act to apply out of the Consolidated Revenue the sum of Six hundred and forty-five thousand two hundred and four pounds to the service of the year One thousand nine hundred and seventeen and One thousand nine hundred and eighteen.
Victorian Loan Act 1918	8 Geo. V. No. 2933	26 March 1918
An Act to authorize the raising of Money for Irrigation Works and Water Supply Works and for Drainage and Flood Protection Works in Country Districts and for Works under the River Murray Waters Acts and for Public Works and other purposes.
Public Works Loan Application Act 1918	9 Geo. V. No. 2934	26 March 1918
An Act to sanction the issue and application of certain Sums of Money available under Loan Acts for Public Works and other purposes.
Municipal Endowment Act 1918	8 Geo. V. No. 2935	26 March 1918
An Act relating to Municipal Endowment.
Water Supply Loans Application Act 1918	8 Geo. V. No. 2936	26 March 1918
An Act to sanction the issue and application of certain Sums of Money available under Loan Acts for Irrigation Works Water Supply Works Drainage and Flood Protection Works in Country Districts and for Works under the River Murray Waters Acts and for other purposes.
Geelong Waterworks and Sewerage (Borrowing Powers) Act 1918	8 Geo. V. No. 2937	26 March 1918
An Act to increase the Borrowing Powers of the Geelong Waterworks and Sewerage Trust.
Country Roads (Special Loan) Act 1918	9 Geo. V. No. 2938	4 April 1918
An Act to make provision for a Special Loan of One hundred thousand pounds for certain purposes under the Country Roads Act 1915. (Note: Country Roads Act 1915 (6 Geo. V. No. 2635))
Geelong Harbor Trust Act 1918	8 Geo. V. No. 2939	4 April 1918
An Act to amend the Geelong Harbor Trust Acts and for other purposes.
Railways Advances Act 1918	9 Geo. V. No. 2940	4 April 1918
An Act to apportion and extend the Time for the Repayments into "The Public Account" of certain Moneys advanced or to be advanced under the Railways Advances Act 1912 (Note: Railways Advances Act 1912 (3 Geo. V. No. 2432)) the Railways Advances Act 1914 (No. 2) (Note: Railways Advances Act 1914 (No. 2) (5 Geo. V. No. 2550)) and the Railways Advances Act 1915. (Note: Railways Advances Act 1915 (6 Geo. V. No. 2585))
Railway Lands Acquisition Act 1918	8 Geo. V. No. 2941	4 April 1918
An Act to amend Section Three of the Railway Lands Acquisition Act 1916. (Note: Railway Lands Acquisition Act 1916 (7 Geo. V. No. 2844))
Railways Act 1918	8 Geo. V. No. 2942	4 April 1918
An Act relating to the Generation Use and Supply of Electricity by the Victorian Railways Commissioners.
Railway Loan Application Act 1918	8 Geo. V. No. 2943	4 April 1918
An Act to sanction the issue and application of certain Sums of Money available under Loan Acts for Railways and for other purposes.
Developmental Roads Act 1918	8 Geo. V. No. 2944	4 April 1918
An Act to make provision for Developmental Roads and to amend the Country Roads Acts.
	8 Geo. V. No. 2945	4 April 1918
An Act to apply a sum out of the Consolidated Revenue to the service of the year ending on the thirtieth day of June One thousand nine hundred and eighteen and to appropriate the Supplies granted in this and the last preceding Session of Parliament.
Friendly Societies Act 1918	9 Geo. V. No. 2946	4 April 1918
An Act relating to Agreements between Medical Practitioners and Friendly Societies or Branches thereof, and for other purposes.
	9 Geo. V. No. 2947	12 July 1918
An Act to apply out of the Consolidated Revenue the sum of Two millions four hundred and fifteen thousand eight hundred and twenty-six pounds to the service of the year One thousand nine hundred and eighteen and One thousand nine hundred and nineteen.
Closer Settlement (Board) Act 1918	9 Geo. V. No. 2948	13 August 1918
An Act to amend Section Four of the Closer Settlement Act 1915. (Note: Closer Settlement Act 1915 (6 Geo. V. No. 2629))
	9 Geo. V. No. 2949	27 August 1918
An Act to apply out of the Consolidated Revenue the sum of Two hundred and forty-four thousand eight hundred and twenty-three pounds to the service of the year One thousand nine hundred and seventeen and One thousand nine hundred and eighteen.
Cool Stores Sites Act 1918	9 Geo. V. No. 2950	24 September 1918
An Act to provide for the Sale of certain Lands at Doncaster Burwood and Diamond Creek being the Sites of Cool Stores built by the Government of Victoria.
Railways Act 1918 (No. 2)	9 Geo. V. No. 2951	8 October 1918
An Act to alter the Method of debiting Expenditure as provided in Section Two of the Railways Act 1916. (Note: Railways Act 1916 (7 Geo. V. No. 2885))
	9 Geo. V. No. 2952	11 October 1918
An Act to apply out of the Consolidated Revenue the sum of One million three hundred and ninety thousand six hundred and three pounds to the service of the year One thousand nine hundred and eighteen and One thousand nine hundred and nineteen.
Tramway Board Act 1918	9 Geo. V. No. 2953	29 October 1918
An Act to extend the Operation of the Tramway Board Acts.
Wills (War Service) Act 1918	9 Geo. V. No. 2954	4 November 1918
An Act to amend the Law with respect to Testamentary Dispositions by Soldiers and Sailors and for other purposes.
Melbourne Harbor Trust Act 1918	9 Geo. V. No. 2955	4 December 1918
An Act to make provision with respect to the vesting of certain Land in the Melbourne Harbor Trust Commissioners and the Dredging of certain Channel and for other purposes.
Water Act 1918	9 Geo. V. No. 2956	4 December 1918
An Act to amend Sections Eighty-five and Three hundred and eight of the Water Act 1915. (Note: Water Act 1915 (6 Geo. V. No. 2747))
Metropolitan Fire Brigades Board Loan Act 1918 (repealed)	9 Geo. V. No. 2957	4 December 1918
An Act to authorize the Metropolitan Fire Brigades Board to borrow a further sum of Fifty thousand pounds and for other purposes. (Repealed by Statute Law Revision Act 1984 (No. 10087))
Surplus Revenue Act 1918	9 Geo. V. No. 2958	4 December 1918
An Act relating to the Surplus Revenue of the Financial Year ended on the thirtieth day of June One thousand nine hundred and eighteen.
Mildura Vineyards Protection Act 1918 (repealed)	9 Geo. V. No. 2959	4 December 1918
An Act relating to Diseases of Vines within the Shire of Mildura and the Protection of Vineyards within the said Shire from such Diseases. (Repealed by Mildura Vineyards Protection Act 1931 (No. 3983))
Acts Interpretation (War Service) Act 1918 (repealed)	9 Geo. V. No. 2960	4 December 1918
An Act relating to the Construction of Enactments with respect to War Service and for other purposes. (Repealed by Acts Interpretation Act 1928 (19 Geo. V. No. 3630))
Land Tax Act 1918	9 Geo. V. No. 2961	11 December 1918
An Act to declare the Rate of Land Tax for the Year ending the thirty-first day of December One thousand nine hundred and nineteen and to amend the Land Tax Acts.
Real Property Act 1918	9 Geo. V. No. 2962	11 December 1918
An Act relating to the Law of Property and for other purposes.
	9 Geo. V. No. 2963	11 December 1918
An Act to apply out of the Consolidated Revenue the sum of Six hundred and ninety-two thousand one hundred and eighty-six pounds to the service of the year One thousand nine hundred and eighteen and One thousand nine hundred and nineteen.
Pilots' Advance Repayment Act 1918 (repealed)	9 Geo. V. No. 2964	23 December 1918
An Act to further amend the Pilots' Advance Repayment Act 1898 (Note: Pilots' Advance Repayment Act 1898 (62 Vict. No. 1569)) and for other purposes. (Repealed by Statute Law Revision Act 1995 (No. 11 of 1995))
Municipal Endowment Act 1918 (No. 2)	9 Geo. V. No. 2965	23 December 1918
An Act relating to Municipal Endowment.
Transfer of Land Act 1918	9 Geo. V. No. 2966	23 December 1918
An Act to amend the Transfer of Land Acts.
Justices Act 1918	9 Geo. V. No. 2967	23 December 1918
An Act to amend the Justices Acts and for other purposes.
Victorian Loan Act 1918 (No. 2)	9 Geo. V. No. 2968	23 December 1918
An Act to authorize the raising of Money for Railways and for Irrigation Works Water Supply Works and Drainage and Flood Protection Works in Country Districts and for Works under the River Murray Waters Acts and for other purposes.
Wheat Marketing Act 1918	9 Geo. V. No. 2969	31 December 1918
An Act to extend the Operation of and to amend the Wheat Marketing Acts.
Portland Shire Hall Act 1918 (repealed)	9 Geo. V. No. 2970	31 December 1918
An Act to revoke the Permanent Reservation and Crown Grant of certain Land at Walook in the Parish and Shire of Portland as a Site for a Shire Hall and certain other purposes and to provide for the Sale of such Land and the Application of the Proceeds towards the Purchase of a Site and the Erection of Buildings for a Shire Hall and certain other purposes. (Repealed by Statute Law Revision Act 1984 (No. 10087))
Public Service Act 1918	9 Geo. V. No. 2971	31 December 1918
An Act to amend the Public Service Act 1915 (No. 2). (Note: Public Service Act 1915 (No. 2) (6 Geo. V. No. 2798))
Railway Loan Application Act 1918 (No. 2)	9 Geo. V. No. 2972	31 December 1918
An Act to sanction the issue and application of certain Sums of Money available under Loan Acts for Railways and for other purposes.
Water Supply Loans Application (No. 2) Act 1918	9 Geo. V. No. 2973	31 December 1918
An Act to sanction the issue and application of certain Sums of Money available under Loan Acts for Irrigation Works Water Supply Works Drainage and Flood Protection Works in Country Districts and for Works under the River Murray Waters Acts and for other purposes.
Metropolitan Hawkers Act 1918	9 Geo. V. No. 2974	31 December 1918
An Act to amend the Law relating to Hawkers and Pedlers.
Health Act 1918	9 Geo. V. No. 2975	31 December 1918
An Act to amend the Law relating to Dangerous Infectious or Contagious Diseases.
Forests Act 1918	9 Geo. V. No. 2976	31 December 1918
An Act to constitute the Forests Commission and to amend the Forests Act 1915 (Note: Forests Act 1915 (6 Geo. V. No. 2655)) and for other purposes.
Cardigan Land Act 1918	9 Geo. V. No. 2977	31 December 1918
An Act to revoke the Permanent Reservation and Crown Grant of Portion of certain Land situate in the Parish of Cardigan as a Site for a Public Park.
Piangil to Pine Tank Railway Construction Act 1918	9 Geo. V. No. 2978	31 December 1918
An Act to authorize the Construction by the State of a Line of Railway from Piangil to Pine Tank.
Manangatang to Bryden's Tank Railway Construction Act 1918	9 Geo. V. No. 2979	31 December 1918
An Act to authorize the Construction by the State of a Line of Railway from Manangatang to Bryden's Tank.
Gaols Act 1918	9 Geo. V. No. 2980	31 December 1918
An Act relating to the Employment of Prisoners and for other purposes.
Local Government Act 1918	9 Geo. V. No. 2981	31 December 1918
An Act to amend the Local Government Acts.
Stamps Act 1918	9 Geo. V. No. 2982	31 December 1918
An Act to amend the Stamps Acts.
Goods Act 1918	9 Geo. V. No. 2983	31 December 1918
An Act to amend Part V. of the Goods Act 1915. (Note: Goods Act 1915 (6 Geo. V. No. 2663))
Murchison and Rushworth Railway Deviation Act 1918 (repealed)	9 Geo. V. No. 2984	31 December 1918
An Act to authorize a Deviation on the Murchison and Rushworth Railway. (Repealed by Transport Act 1983 (No. 9921))
Developmental Roads Act 1918 (No. 2)	9 Geo. V. No. 2985	31 December 1918
An Act to make further provision with respect to Developmental Roads.
Country Roads Act 1918	9 Geo. V. No. 2986	31 December 1918
An Act to amend the Country Roads Acts and for other purposes.
Closer Settlement Act 1918	9 Geo. V. No. 2987	31 December 1918
An Act to amend the Closer Settlement Act 1915 and for other purposes.
Discharged Soldiers Settlement Act 1918	9 Geo. V. No. 2988	31 December 1918
An Act to amend the Discharged Soldiers Settlement Act 1917 (Note: Discharged Soldiers Settlement Act 1917 (8 Geo. V. No. 2916)) and for other purposes.
Local Government (Moorabbin and Sandringham) Act 1918	9 Geo. V. No. 2989	31 December 1918
An Act relating to the Municipalities of Moorabbin and Sandringham.
Fitzroy Northcote and Preston Tramways Act 1918	9 Geo. V. No. 2990	31 December 1918
An Act to increase the Borrowing Powers of the Fitzroy Northcote and Preston Tramways Trust.
State Savings Bank Act 1918	9 Geo. V. No. 2991	31 December 1918
An Act to confer certain Powers on the Commissioners of the State Savings Bank of Victoria.
Second-hand Dealers Act 1918	9 Geo. V. No. 2992	31 December 1918
An Act to regulate the Sale and Purchase of Goods by Second-hand Dealers.
Teachers Act 1918	9 Geo. V. No. 2993	31 December 1918
An Act relating to State School Teachers.
Venereal Diseases Act 1918	9 Geo. V. No. 2994	31 December 1918
An Act to amend the Venereal Diseases Act 1916 (Note: Venereal Diseases Act 1916 (7 Geo. V. No. 2858)) and for other purposes.

== Sources ==
- "1918 Victorian Historical Acts". AustLII.
