= List of acts of the Parliament of Victoria from 1946 =

This is a list of acts of the Parliament of Victoria, Australia for the year 1946.

== 1946 ==
| Short title, or popular name | Citation | Royal assent |
Long title
| Public Works Loan and Application Act 1946 | No. 5120 | 14 May 1946 |
An Act to authorize the Raising of further Money for Public Works and other purposes and to sanction the Issue and Application for such Purposes of the Money so raised or of Money in the State Loans Repayment Fund, and for other purposes.
| Public Service Act 1946 | No. 5124 | 17 May 1946 |
An Act to consolidate and amend the Law relating to the Public Service of Victoria.
| Teaching Service Act 1946 | No. 5125 | 17 May 1946 |
An Act to consolidate and amend the Law relating to the Teaching Service in the Education Department.
| Railways (Long Service) Act 1946 | No. 5127 | 17 May 1946 |
An Act to amend the Railways (Long Service) Act 1942 (Note: Railways (Long Service) Act 1942 (No. 4930)) and for other purposes.
| | No. 5134 | 27 May 1946 |
An Act to apply out of the Consolidated Revenue the sum of Two hundred and twenty-three thousand two hundred and seventy-seven pounds to the service of the year One thousand nine hundred and forty-five and One thousand nine hundred and forty-six.
| | No. 5135 | 27 May 1946 |
An Act to apply out of the Consolidated Revenue the sum of Six million and fifty-five thousand three hundred and seventy-one pounds to the service of the year One thousand nine hundred and forty-six and One thousand nine hundred and forty-seven.
| Apprenticeship Act 1946 | No. 5136 | 27 May 1946 |
An Act to amend the Law relating to Apprenticeship.
| | No. 5137 | 3 October 1946 |
An Act to apply out of the Consolidated Revenue the sum of Two million and sixty-six thousand six hundred and fifteen pounds to the service of the year One thousand nine hundred and forty-six and One thousand nine hundred and forty-seven.
| | No. 5138 | 29 October 1946 |
An Act to apply out of the Consolidated Revenue the sum of Four hundred and forty-seven thousand five hundred and forty-one pounds to the service of the year One thousand nine hundred and forty-five and One thousand nine hundred and forty-six.
| | No. 5139 | 31 October 1946 |
An Act to apply out of the Consolidated Revenue the sum of Four million and three hundred and ninety-one thousand three hundred and fifty-one pounds to the service of the year One thousand nine hundred and forty-six and One thousand nine hundred and forty-seven.
| Nicholson-street Tramway Construction Act 1946 | No. 5140 | 12 November 1946 |
An Act to authorize the Construction by the Melbourne and Metropolitan Tramways Board of an Electric Tramway in Nicholson-street East Brunswick.
| Burke-road Tramway Construction Act 1946 | No. 5141 | 12 November 1946 |
An Act to authorize the Construction by the Melbourne and Metropolitan Tramways Board of an Electric Tramway in Burke-road in the Cities of Camberwell and Kew.
| Ballaarat Gas Company's Act 1946 (repealed) | No. 5142 | 12 November 1946 |
An Act to amend The Ballaarat Gas Company's Acts. (Repealed by Statute Law Revision Act 1995 (No. 11 of 1995))
| Moorpanyal Land Act 1946 (repealed) | No. 5157 | 26 November 1946 |
An Act to ratify an Agreement between the Commissioner of Crown Lands and Survey, the Geelong Harbor Trust Commissioners, and the Ford Manufacturing Company of Australia Proprietary Limited, to authorize the Divesting of certain Lands from the Geelong Harbor Trust Commissioners and the Transfer thereof to the said Company, and for other purposes. (Repealed by Statute Law Revision Act 1984 (No. 10087))
| University (Mildura Branch) Act 1946 | No. 5162 | 3 December 1946 |
An Act to make provision for the Establishment of a Branch of the University of Melbourne at or near Mildura and for purposes connected therewith.
| Local Government (Dandenong Street Construction) Act 1946 | No. 5166 | 10 December 1946 |
An Act to make provision for Payment by the Owners of certain Lands in the Shire of Dandenong of certain Sums in respect of the Construction of certain Streets and Outfall Drains in the said Shire and to make the Payment of the said Sums a Charge upon the said Lands and to Validate the raising of certain Loans for the purpose of the Construction of the said Streets and Outfall Drains, and for other purposes.
| Administration and Probate Duties Act 1946 | No. 5170 | 10 December 1946 |
An Act to continue the Operation of Part III. of the Finance Act 1930. (Note: Finance Act 1930 (No. 3889))
| Railways (Sick Leave) Act 1946 | No. 5172 | 24 December 1946 |
An Act relating to Sick Leave for Daily Paid Employés in the Railway Service.
| Melbourne South Land Act 1946 (repealed) | No. 5176 | 24 December 1946 |
An Act to revoke the Reservation of certain Lands in the Parish of Melbourne South permanently reserved as Sites for Road Purposes and Ornamental Purposes respectively and to provide for the Reservation of a Portion of the said Lands together with certain unalienated Crown Land adjacent thereto as a Site for a National Art Gallery and Cultural Centre, and for other purposes. (Repealed by Statute Law Revision Act 1984 (No. 10087))
| Agricultural Colleges (Amendment) Act 1946 | No. 5177 | 24 December 1946 |
An Act to amend Section Five of the Agricultural Colleges Act 1944. (Note: Agricultural Colleges Act 1944 (No. 5044))
| Adult Education Act 1946 | No. 5181 | 24 December 1946 |
An Act to provide for the Constitution and Functions of a Council of Adult Education, and for other purposes.
| Parliamentary Contributory Retirement Fund Act 1946 | No. 5185 | 24 December 1946 |
An Act to provide for a Contributory Retirement Fund for Members of Parliament, and for other purposes.
| Railways (Mont Park Siding) Act 1946 (repealed) | No. 5188 | 24 December 1946 |
An Act to authorize The Victorian Railways Commissioners to operate a Public Passenger Service upon a Siding constructed between Macleod Railway Station and the Mont Park Mental Hospital under Agreement with the Board of Land and Works, and for other purposes. (Repealed by Transport Act 1983 (No. 9921))
| Railway Loan Application Act 1946 | No. 5193 | 24 December 1946 |
An Act to sanction the Issue and Application of certain Sums of Money available for Railways under Loan Acts or in the State Loans Repayment Fund, and for other purposes.
| Metropolitan Gas Company's Act 1946 (repealed) | No. 5194 | 24 December 1946 |
An Act to extend the Limits of The Metropolitan Gas Company's Act 1878 (Note: Metropolitan Gas Company's Act 1878 (41 Vict. No. 586)) and to enable the Council of the City of Heidelberg to sell and The Metropolitan Gas Company to purchase the Gas Undertaking of the said Council at Heidelberg. (Repealed by Statute Law Revision Act 1995 (No. 11 of 1995))
| Railways (Temporary Employés) Act 1946 or the Railways (Temporary Employees) Act 1946 | No. 5195 | 24 December 1946 |
An Act relating to the Appointment of certain Persons temporarily employed in the Railway Service to Permanent Offices therein.
| Railways (State Coal Mine) Act 1946 | No. 5196 | 24 December 1946 |
An Act to make Provision with respect to the Granting of Long Service Leave with Pay to certain Officers and Employés at the State Coal Mine.
| Public Works Loan and Application Act 1946 (No. 2) (repealed) | No. 5199 | 24 December 1946 |
An Act to authorize the Raising of further Money for Public Works and other Purposes and to sanction the Issue and Application for such Purposes of the Money so raised or of Money in the State Loans Repayment Fund, and for other purposes. (Repealed by Treasury Legislation (Repeal) Act 2005 (No. 73 of 2005))
| Local Government Act 1946 | No. 5203 | 31 December 1946 |
An Act to consolidate the Law relating to Local Government.
| | No. 5205 | 31 December 1946 |
An Act to apply a sum out of the Consolidated Revenue to the service of the year ending on the thirtieth day of June One thousand nine hundred and forty-seven and to appropriate the Supplies granted in this Session of Parliament.
| Building Operations and Building Materials Control Act 1946 | No. | |
| Cattle and Swine Compensation Act 1946 | No. | |
| Cattle Breeding Act 1946 | No. | |
| Clifton Hill Land Act 1946 | No. | |
| Co-operative Housing Societies (Guarantees) Act 1946 | No. | |
| Co-operative Housing Societies Act 1946 | No. | |
| Country Fire Authority Act 1946 | No. | |
| Country Roads Board Fund (Amendment) Act 1946 | No. | |
| Crimes (Indeterminate Sentences) Act 1946 | No. | |
| Drought Relief (Amendment) Act 1946 | No. | |
| Drought Relief Act 1946 | No. | |
| Economic Stability Act 1946 | No. | |
| Evidence Act 1946 | No. | |
| Factories and Shops (Annual Holidays) Act 1946 | No. | |
| Factories and Shops (Annual Holidays) Amendment Act 1946 | No. | |
| Factories and Shops (Bread Carters) Act 1946 | No. | |
| Factories and Shops (Bread) Act 1946 | No. | |
| Factories and Shops (Early Closing) Act 1946 | No. | |
| Factories and Shops (Wages Board) Act 1946 | No. | |
| Farm Water Supplies and Drainage Advances Act 1946 | No. | |
| Farmers Protection (Amendment) Act 1946 | No. | |
| Forests (Exchange of Lands) Extension Act 1946 | No. | |
| Free Library Service Board Act 1946 | No. | |
| Friendly Societies Act 1946 | No. | |
| Fruit and Vegetables Act 1946 | No. | |
| Geelong Land Act 1946 | No. | |
| Housing (Commonwealth and State Agreement) Act 1946 | No. | |
| Housing (Discharged Servicemen) Act 1946 | No. | |
| Infectious Diseases Hospital (Borrowing) Act 1946 | No. | |
| Juries (Fees) Act 1946 | No. | |
| Land (Grazing Licences) Act 1946 | No. | |
| Land Tax Act 1946 | No. | |
| Legal Profession Practice Act 1946 | No. | |
| Licensing Act 1946 | No. | |
| Local Government (Emergency Housing Accommodation) Amendment Act 1946 | No. | |
| Local Government (Municipal Rolls) Act 1946 | No. | |
| Marine (Pilots and Pilotage Rates) Act 1946 | No. | |
| Medical (Chemists' Apprentices) Act 1946 | No. | |
| Medical Practitioners' Registration Act 1946 | No. | |
| Melbourne and Metropolitan Board of Works (Contributions) Act 1946 | No. | |
| Melbourne and Metropolitan Tramways (Amendment) Act 1946 | No. | |
| Melbourne and Metropolitan Tramways (Appeal Board) Act 1946 | No. | |
| Money Lenders (Cash Orders) Act 1946 | No. | |
| Mornington Sewerage Authority (Validation) Act 1946 | No. | |
| Municipal Endowment (Temporary Discontinuance) Act 1946 | No. | |
| Patriotic Funds Act 1946 | No. | |
| Police Offences (Race-meetings) Act 1946 | No. | |
| Police Regulation Act 1946 | No. | |
| Seeds Act 1946 | No. | |
| Sewerage Districts (Amendment) Act 1946 | No. | |
| Soldier Settlement (Amendment) Act 1946 | No. | |
| Soldier Settlement Act 1946 | No. | |
| Stamps (Betting Tax) Act 1946 | No. | |
| Stamps (Increased Duty Continuance) Act 1946 | No. | |
| Stamps Act 1946 | No. | |
| State Forests Loan and Application Act 1946 | No. | |
| Stock Foods (Amendment) Act 1946 | No. | |
| Supreme Court (Judges) Act 1946 | No. | |
| Taxation (Arrangements) Act 1946 | No. | |
| Tobacco Sellers Act 1946 | No. | |
| Totalizator (Charities) Act 1946 | No. | |
| Town and Country Planning Act 1946 | No. | |
| Transport Regulation (Amendment) Act 1946 | No. | |
| Trotting Races Act 1946 | No. | |
| Water (Levee Banks) Act 1946 | No. | |
| Water Act 1946 | No. | |
| Water Supply Loans and Application Act 1946 | No. | |
| Workers' Compensation Act 1946 | No. | |

== Sources ==
- "1946 Victorian Historical Acts". AustLII.
