= List of acts of the Parliament of Victoria from 1935 =

This is a list of acts of the Parliament of Victoria, Australia for the year 1935.

== 1935 ==
Short title, or popular name	Citation	Royal assent
Long title
Dairy Products Act 1935	No. 4280	28 June 1935
An Act to amend the Dairy Products Act 1933. (Note: Dairy Products Act 1933 (No. 4204))
	No. 4284	28 June 1935
An Act to apply out of the Consolidated Revenue the sum of Two million three hundred and eighty-two thousand seven hundred and nineteen pounds to the service of the year One thousand nine hundred and thirty-five and One thousand nine hundred and thirty-six.
	No. 4292	12 August 1935
An Act to apply out of the Consolidated Revenue the sum of Five hundred and five thousand and eleven pounds to the service of the year One thousand nine hundred and thirty-four and One thousand nine hundred and thirty-five.
	No. 4296	4 September 1935
An Act to apply out of the Consolidated Revenue the sum of Two million three hundred and nine thousand seven hundred and seventy-three pounds to the service of the year One thousand nine hundred and thirty-five and One thousand nine hundred and thirty-six.
Unemployment Relief Loan and Application Act 1935 (repealed)	No. 4301	30 September 1935
An Act to amend the Unemployment Relief Loan and Application Act 1932. (Note: Unemployment Relief Loan and Application Act 1932 (No. 4097)) (Repealed by Treasury Legislation (Repeal) Act 2005 (No. 73 of 2005))
Electoral Act 1935	No. 4305	11 October 1935
An Act to amend the Electoral Act 1934. (Note: Electoral Act 1934 (No. 4278))
South Melbourne and Port Melbourne Land Act 1935 (repealed)	No. 4306	11 October 1935
An Act to ratify and validate an Agreement entered into between the Commissioner of Crown Lands and Survey and General Motors-Holden's Limited, to revoke the Permanent Reservation of Portion of certain Crown Land in the Cities of South Melbourne and Port Melbourne permanently reserved as a Site for Public Purposes and to provide for the Crown Grant of such Portion of the said Land. (Repealed by Statute Law Revision Act 1984 (No. 10087))
Administration and Probate Duties Act 1935	No. 4311	14 October 1935
An Act to continue the operation of Part III. of the Finance Act 1930. (Note: Finance Act 1930 (No. 3889))
	No. 4318	30 October 1935
An Act to apply out of the Consolidated Revenue the sum of One million two hundred and seventy-six thousand five hundred and forty-seven pounds to the service of the year One thousand nine hundred and thirty-five and One thousand nine hundred and thirty-six.
Auction Sales Act 1935	No. 4323	11 November 1935
An Act to amend the Law relating to Sales by Auction and Auctioneers.
Parliamentary Elections (Railway Employés and Civil Servants) Act 1935 or the Parliamentary Elections (Railway Employees and Civil Servants) Act 1935	No. 4334	2 December 1935
An Act to allow Railway Employés and all Civil Servants to contest any Parliamentary Election without having to resign from the Service.
Cinematograph Films (Australian Quota) Act 1935	No. 4335	2 December 1935
An Act to provide for an Australian Film Quota and for other purposes.
	No. 4341	5 December 1935
An Act to apply out of the Consolidated Revenue the sum of One million three hundred and ninety-six thousand four hundred and thirteen pounds to the service of the year One thousand nine hundred and thirty-five and One thousand nine hundred and thirty-six.
Royal Melbourne Hospital Act 1935	No. 4342	9 December 1935
An Act to provide for the Sale of certain Land in the City of Melbourne granted by the Crown as a Site or Place to be used as and for a General Hospital and Recreation Grounds for the same and also to provide for a General Hospital on certain other Land of the Crown in the said City to be permanently reserved for a General Hospital and granted to The Royal Melbourne Hospital and for other purposes.
Dairy Produce Act 1935	No. 4349	10 December 1935
An Act to amend the Law relating to Dairy Produce.
Opticians Registration Act 1935 (repealed)	No. 4357	17 December 1935
An Act to provide for the Registration of Opticians and for other purposes. (Repealed by Opticians Registration Act 1958 (No. 6329))
Bendigo Land Act 1935	No.	
Cardigan Land Act 1935	No.	
Closer Settlement (Financial) Act 1935	No.	
Companies (Special Investigations) Act 1935	No.	
Country Roads (Impounding of Cattle) Act 1935	No.	
Country Roads (Murry Diversion) Act 1935	No.	
Country Roads Board Fund Act 1935	No.	
County Court (Judges Retirement) Act 1935	No.	
Entertainments Tax Act 1935	No.	
Factories and Shops (Tramway Conversion Board) Act 1935	No.	
Farmers Advances Act 1935	No.	
Farmers Debts Adjustment Act 1935	No.	
Financial Emergency (Amendment) Act 1935	No.	
Financial Emergency (Mortgages) Act 1935	No.	
Financial Emergency (Salaries and Pensions) Continuation Act 1935	No.	
Fungicides Act 1935	No.	
Grain Elevators Act 1935	No.	
Health Act 1935	No.	
Income Tax Act 1935	No.	
Justices Act 1935	No.	
Justices of the Peace Act 1935	No.	
Land (Residence Areas) Act 1935	No.	
Land Tax Act 1935	No.	
Landlord and Tenant (Rent Reduction) Amendment Act 1935	No.	
Landlord and Tenant (Rent Reduction) Continuation Act 1935	No.	
Legislative Council Elections Act 1935	No.	
Licensing (Australian Wine License) Act 1935	No.	
Local Government (Amendment) Act 1935	No.	
Local Government (Camberwell Street Construction) Act 1935	No.	
Local Government (Preferential Voting) Act 1935	No.	
Local Government (Temporary Reduction of Interest) Act 1935	No.	
Maintenance Act 1935	No.	
Maintenance and Alimony (Imprisonment) Act 1935	No.	
Marketing of Primary Products Act 1935	No.	
Masseurs Act 1935	No.	
Medical Act 1935	No.	
Melbourne Land (Mercer-street) Act 1935	No.	
Melbourne Land Act 1935	No.	
Mildura Irrigation Trust (Drainage) Act 1935	No.	
Mines (Petroleum) Act 1935	No.	
Motor Car (Amendment) Act 1935	No.	
Motor Car Act 1935	No.	
Newmarket Sheep Sales Act 1935	No.	
Police Offences (Contraceptives) Act 1935	No.	
Police Offences (Race-meetings) Act 1935	No.	
Public Works Committee Act 1935	No.	
Public Works Loan Application Act 1935	No.	
Railway Loan Application Act 1935	No.	
Railways Act 1935	No.	
Road Traffic Act 1935	No.	
Seeds Act 1935	No.	
Sewerage Districts (Temporary Reduction of Interest) Act 1935	No.	
Sheep Owners Protection Act 1935	No.	
Stamps (Increased Duty Continuance) Act 1935	No.	
State Forests Loan Application Act 1935	No.	
Superannuation (Retirement) Act 1935	No.	
Superannuation Act 1935	No.	
Transport Regulation Act 1935	No.	
Treasury Bonds Act 1935	No.	
Unemployment Relief Tax (Rates) Act 1935	No.	
University (Veterinary Research) Act 1935	No.	
Water Supply Loans Application Act 1935	No.	
Unemployment Relief Tax (Rates) Act 1935	No.	
University (Veterinary Research) Act 1935	No.	
Water Supply Loans Application Act 1935	No.	
Workers' Compensation Act 1935	No.	

== Sources ==
- "1935 Victorian Historical Acts". AustLII.
