= Statute Law Revision Act 2015 =

Oireachtas
- Long title: An Act to promote the revision of statute law by revoking, with the exception of certain instruments, every instrument made before 1 January 1821, to identify those instruments that are not being revoked by this Act, to assign citations to those instruments so as to facilitate their citation, to amend the Statutory Instruments Act 1947, to provide a means by which prima facie evidence of certain instruments may be given, to transfer certain functions under the Statute Law Revision Act 2007 and to provide for related matters.
- Citation: No. 23 of 2015
- Enacted by: Dáil Éireann
- Signed: 18 July 2015
- Commenced: 18 July 2015
- Status: Current legislation

The Statute Law Revision Act 2015 is a Statute Law Revision Act enacted by the Oireachtas in Ireland to review secondary legislation (mainly proclamations and orders) passed from 1066 to 1820. The Act revoked a large number of pieces of secondary legislation of Ireland, England, Great Britain and the United Kingdom while preserving a shorter list of instruments that were deemed suitable for retention.

The act is part of the Statute Law Revision Programme which has also seen the enactment of statute law revision legislation between 2005 and 2016. The act also amended the Statutory Instruments Act 1947 to remove most exemptions from the requirement to publish statutory instruments.

== Scope ==
The act preserved a total of 43 pre-1821 instruments, while revoking 5,782 explicitly and around 7,000 implicitly.
