= Statute Law Revision Act 2012 =

Act of the Irish Parliament

The Statute Law Revision Act 2012 (No 19) is a Statute Law Revision Act enacted by the Oireachtas in Ireland to review local and personal acts passed from 1851 to 1922 and private acts passed from 1751 to 1922. The act repealed a large number of pre-1922 local and personal, and private acts of Ireland, England, Great Britain and the United Kingdom while preserving a shorter list of statutes that were deemed suitable for retention.

== Scope ==
The Statute Law Revision Act 2012 followed on from the Statute Law Revision Act 2009 which involved a review of local and personal legislation pre-1850 and private legislation pre-1750 and the Statute Law Revision Act 2007 which reviewed public general acts applying to Ireland that were enacted before the establishment of the Irish Free State in 1922.
