= Statute Law Revision Act 2007 =

Irish legislation

Oireachtas
- Long title: AN ACT TO PROMOTE THE REVISION OF STATUTE LAW BY REPEALING CERTAIN STATUTES THAT WERE ENACTED BEFORE 6 DECEMBER 1922 AND WHICH HAVE CEASED TO HAVE EFFECT OR HAVE BECOME UNNECESSARY, BY IDENTIFYING THOSE STATUTES PRIMARILY OF A PUBLIC AND GENERAL NATURE THAT WERE SO ENACTED BUT ARE NOT BEING REPEALED BY THIS ACT, BY ASSIGNING SHORT TITLES TO CERTAIN STATUTES IN ORDER TO FACILITATE THEIR CITATION AND BY AMENDING CERTAIN STATUTES IN SO FAR AS THEY RELATE TO SHORT TITLES, TO PROVIDE FOR PRIMA FACIE EVIDENCE TO BE GIVEN OF CERTAIN STATUTES, AND TO PROVIDE FOR RELATED MATTERS.
- Citation: No. 28 of 2007
- Enacted by: Dáil Éireann
- Signed: 8 May 2007
- Commenced: 8 May 2007
- Status: Amended

The Statute Law Revision Act 2007 is an act of the Oireachtas of Ireland which repealed a large amount of pre-1922 legislation of Ireland, England, Great Britain and the United Kingdom while preserving a shorter list of statutes. The act was the largest single Statute Law Revision Act or repealing measure ever enacted internationally.

== Background ==
Prior to the 2007 act, statute law revision had been sporadic since Irish independence in 1922. The Statute Law Revision (Pre-Union Irish Statutes) Act 1962 was one major such act which repealed obsolete legislation of the Parliament of Ireland, which had provided that the Kings of England should be Kings of Ireland (from 1951 called in Northern Ireland the Crown of Ireland Act 1542), together with certain others from 1459 to 1800. Following this, the Statute Law Revision Act 1983 was the last major act repealing pre-1922 statutes before the current phase of statute law revision, which commenced in 2003 and which also saw the enactment of an initial act, the Statute Law Revision (Pre-1922) Act 2005.

== Scope ==
The Attorney General of Ireland examined 26,370 public general statutes enacted before the creation of the Irish Free State in 1922. Of these 9,219 were already wholly repealed prior to 1 May 2007, and 12,562 were not applicable to Ireland. This left 4,589 statutes still in force, of which 3,225 were to be repealed by the act and were listed in Schedule 2, some of which were in any case by then unconstitutional. The act repealed all public general statutes enacted before 6 December 1922, listed or not, except for 1,364 explicitly in Schedule 1 of the act; these were given short names where they did not already have them.

Private, local or personal acts remained in force, with many of these repealed in the Statute Law Revision Act 2009.

The number of acts repealed in this one piece of legislation exceeded the number of public general acts passed after 6 December 1922 (the start of the Irish Free State) up to 1 May 2007 (3,189).

== Acts repealed ==
Among the numerous acts repealed were Poynings' Act 1495, the Government of Ireland Act 1920, the Irish Free State (Agreement) Act 1922 and the Irish Free State Constitution Act 1922.

== Acts retained ==
Among the older acts retained were the Great Charter of Ireland (the Irish version of Magna Carta) and the Mayor of Dublin Act 1229. The Counties of Meath and Westmeath Act 1543, which partitioned Meath in two, was also retained; as was the English Bill of Rights 1688, however it was partly repealed, including the provision that guaranteed Protestants the right to bear arms. The Marriage (No. 2) Act 1537 (28 & 29 Hen. 8. c. 17 (I)) was also retained and this retention has been the subject of academic criticism from Dr Maebh Harding.

== Subsequent statute law revision programme ==
Following the 2007 Act, the Oireachtas enacted further legislation dealing with Local and Personal and Private Acts enacted pre-1922, the Statute Law Revision Act 2009 and the Statute Law Revision Act 2012.

== See also ==
- Statute Law Revision (Pre-Union Irish Statutes) Act 1962

== Sources ==
- Act and explanatory memorandum
