= Statute Law Revision Act 2009 =

The Statute Law Revision Act 2009 is a Statute Law Revision Act enacted by the Oireachtas in Ireland to review local and personal acts passed prior to 1850 and private acts passed prior to 1750. The act repealed a large number of pre-1922 local and personal, and private acts of Ireland, England, Great Britain and the United Kingdom while preserving a shorter list of statutes that were deemed suitable for retention.

== Scope ==
The Statute Law Revision Act 2009 followed on from the Statute Law Revision Act 2007 which reviewed Public General Acts applying to Ireland that were enacted before the establishment of the Irish Free State in 1922. The 2009 act involved a review of local and personal legislation pre-1850 and Private legislation pre-1750. It repealed 1,347 acts of a private or local and personal nature listed in schedule 2 to the act. It retains 138 local and personal, or private, acts, which are listed in Schedule 1 to the act.

Dr Eoin O'Dell commented on the bill that "As Brian Hunt of Dublin solicitors firm Mason Hayes & Curran pointed out at an earlier stage in the process, this is difficult, technical, toilsome work with few visible results; but it is entirely necessary; and I’m delighted to see that it is progressing so effectively."

== Acts repealed ==
Among the acts repealed as being obsolete were:

- An act of 1726 for the naturalisation of George Frideric Handel and others.
- An act of 1826 regarding the American and Colonial Steam Navigation Company for the removal of "the surplus population of Ireland"
- An act of 1714 to enable the then Prince of Wales (later King George II) to qualify as Chancellor of the University of Dublin.
