= Statute Law Revision Act =

Stock short title used for legislation

Statute Law Revision Act (with its variations) is a stock short title which has been used in Antigua, Australia, Barbados, Bermuda, Canada, Ghana, the Republic of Ireland, South Africa and the United Kingdom, for Acts with the purpose of statute law revision. Such Acts normally repealed legislation which was expired, spent, repealed in general terms, virtually repealed, superseded, obsolete or unnecessary. In the United Kingdom, Statute Law (Repeals) Acts are now passed instead. "Statute Law Revision Acts" may collectively refer to enactments with this short title.

The single largest Statute Law Revision Act in any jurisdiction was the Statute Law Revision Act 2007 enacted in Ireland which repealed 3,225 previous acts. The Statute Law Revision programme commenced in Ireland in 2003 which has resulted in six Statute Law Revision Acts to date (see below) and the express repeal of a total of around 8,000 acts is the largest statute law revision programme carried out internationally.

Statute Law Revision Acts are sometimes referred to as expurgation Acts. (Note: Courtenay Ilbert applied the term expurgatory Act both to Statute Law Revision Acts and also to acts which, although they consisted almost entirely of repeals, did not come within the narrow lines laid down for the Statute Law Revision Acts, because they contained substantive enactments. Examples included the Promissory Oaths Act 1871, the Statute Law Revision and Civil Procedure Act 1881, the Statute Law Revision and Civil Procedure Act 1883 and the Summary Jurisdiction Act 1884.)

== United Kingdom ==
Halsbury's Laws says that Statute Law Revision Acts are law reform Acts.

Under the standing orders of both Houses of Parliament, Statute Law Revision Bills must be referred to the Joint Committee on Consolidation etc. Bills. The Statute Law Committee prepared the bills for Statute Law Revision Acts up to, and including, the Statute Law Revision Act 1966.

The scope of Statute Law Revision Bills is confined to the repeal of obsolete, spent, unnecessary or superseded enactments.

The bill for the Statute Law Revision Act 1892 contains the following note, which describes the classes of enactments repealed by that act. Certain other Statute Law Revision Bills contain similar notes as they repealed similar classes of enactments.

The schedule is intended to comprise (as the preamble to the Bill states) enactments which have ceased to be in force, otherwise than by express specific repeal, and also such parts of titles, preambles, recitals, and enacting words as are unnecessary and intended to be omitted in future editions of the Statutes under the authority of the Bill.

I.—For the purposes of the schedule six different classes of enactments are considered as having ceased to be in force, although not expressly and specifically repealed; namely, such enactments as are—
1. Expired.—that is, enactments which, having been originally limited to endure only for a specified period, by a distinct provision, have not been either perpetuated or kept in force by continuance, or which have merely had for their object the continuance of previous temporary enactments for periods now gone by effluxion of time:
2. Spent (Note: As to the use of the term spent, see 1 Blackst. Comm. 44. (14th ed.), 2nd Report of the late Statute Law Commissioners, p. 7, and Warren v. Windle, 3 East, 205.)—that is, enactments spent or exhausted in operation by the accomplishment of the purposes for which they were passed, either at the moment of their first taking effect, or on the happening of some event, or on the doing of some act authorised or required:
3. Repealed in general terms.—that is, repealed by the operation of an enactment expressed only in general terms, as distinguished from an enactment specifying the Acts on which it is to operate:
4. Virtually repealed.—where an earlier enactment is inconsistent with, or is rendered nugatory by, a later one:
5. Superseded.—where a later enactment affects the same purposes as an earlier one, by repetition of its terms or otherwise:
6. Obsolete.—where the state of things contemplated by the enactment has ceased to exist, or the enactment is of such a nature as to be no longer capable of being put in force, regard being had to the alteration of political or social circumstances.
II.—Where any enactment is comprised in the schedule on any ground not above explained, the ground of repeal sufficiently appears from the expressions used in the third column.

Enactments repealed by Statute Law Revision Acts include enactments which had become totally inoperative from having been impliedly repealed.

The following list includes any act the short title of which includes the words "statute law revision", without prejudice to suggestions that some of these acts are not actually Statute Law Revision Acts.

- The Statute Law Revision Act 1861 (24 & 25 Vict. c. 101)
- The Statute Law Revision Act 1863 (26 & 27 Vict. c. 125)
- The Statute Law Revision Act 1867 (30 & 31 Vict. c. 59)
- The Statute Law Revision Act 1870 (33 & 34 Vict. c. 69)
- The Statute Law Revision Act 1871 (34 & 35 Vict. c. 116)
- The Statute Law Revision Act 1872 (35 & 36 Vict. c. 63)
- The Statute Law Revision Act 1872 (No. 2) (35 & 36 Vict. c. 97)
- The Statute Law Revision Act 1873 (36 & 37 Vict. c. 91)
- The Statute Law Revision Act 1874 (37 & 38 Vict. c. 35)
- The Statute Law Revision Act 1874 (No. 2) (37 & 38 Vict. c. 96)
- The Statute Law Revision Act 1875 (38 & 39 Vict. c. 66)
- The Statute Law Revision (Substituted Enactments) Act 1876 (39 & 40 Vict. c. 20)
- The Statute Law Revision Act 1878 (41 & 42 Vict. c. 79)
- The Statute Law Revision and Civil Procedure Act 1881 (44 & 45 Vict. c. 59)
- The Statute Law Revision Act 1883 (46 & 47 Vict. c. 39)
- The Statute Law Revision and Civil Procedure Act 1883 (46 & 47 Vict. c. 49)
- The Statute Law Revision Act 1887 (50 & 51 Vict. c. 59)
- The Statute Law Revision Act 1888 (51 & 52 Vict. c. 3)
- The Statute Law Revision (No. 2) Act 1888 (51 & 52 Vict. c. 57)
- The Statute Law Revision Act 1890 (53 & 54 Vict. c. 33)
- The Statute Law Revision (No. 2) Act 1890 (53 & 54 Vict. c. 51)
- The Statute Law Revision Act 1891 (54 & 55 Vict. c. 67)
- The Statute Law Revision Act 1892 (55 & 56 Vict. c. 19)
- The Statute Law Revision Act 1893 (56 & 57 Vict. c. 14)
- The Statute Law Revision (No. 2) Act 1893 (56 & 57 Vict. c 54)
- The Statute Law Revision Act 1894 (57 & 58 Vict. c. 56)
- The Statute Law Revision Act 1898 (61 & 62 Vict. c. 22)
- The Statute Law Revision Act 1908 (8 Edw. 7. c. 49)
- The Statute Law Revision Act 1927 (17 & 18 Geo. 5. c. 42)
- The Statute Law Revision Act 1948 (11 & 12 Geo. 6. c. 62)
- The Statute Law Revision Act 1950 (14 Geo. 6. c. 6)
- The Statute Law Revision Act 1953 (2 & 3 Eliz. 2. c. 5)
- The Statute Law Revision Act 1958 (6 & 7 Eliz. 2. c. 46)
- The Statute Law Revision Act 1959 (7 & 8 Eliz. 2. c. 68)
- The Statute Law Revision Act 1960 (8 & 9 Eliz. 2. c. 56)
- The Statute Law Revision Act 1963 (c. 30)
- The Statute Law Revision Act 1964 (c. 79)
- The Statute Law Revision (Consequential Repeals) Act 1965 (c. 55)
- The Statute Law Revision Act 1966 (c. 5)

Courtenay Ilbert said that the Repeal of Obsolete Statutes Act 1856 (19 & 20 Vict. c. 64) was the first Statute Law Revision Act.

The Promissory Oaths Act 1871 (34 & 35 Vict. c. 48), the Civil Procedure Acts Repeal Act 1879 (42 & 43 Vict. c. 59), and the Master and Servant Act 1889 (52 & 53 Vict. c. 24) were expressed by their preambles to be passed for the purpose of statute law revision.

=== Scotland ===
- The Statute Law Revision (Scotland) Act 1906 (6 Edw. 7. c. 38)
- The Statute Law Revision (Scotland) Act 1964 (c. 80)

=== Ireland (before 1922) ===
- The Statute Law Revision (Ireland) Act 1872 (35 & 36 Vict. c. 98)
- The Statute Law Revision (Ireland) Act 1878 (41 & 42 Vict. c. 57)
- The Statute Law Revision (Ireland) Act 1879 (42 & 43 Vict. c. 24)

=== Northern Ireland ===
- The Statute Law Revision Act (Northern Ireland) 1952 (c. 1) (NI)
- The Statute Law Revision Act (Northern Ireland) 1953 (c. 1) (NI)
- The Statute Law Revision Act (Northern Ireland) 1954 (c. 35) (NI)
- The Statute Law Revision (Northern Ireland) Act 1973 (c. 55)
- The Statute Law Revision (Northern Ireland) Act 1976 (c. 12)
- The Statute Law Revision (Northern Ireland) Act 1980 (c. 59)

The Statute Law Revision Acts (Northern Ireland) 1952 and 1953 means the Statute Law Revision Act (Northern Ireland) 1952 and the Statute Law Revision Act (Northern Ireland) 1953.

The Statute Law Revision Acts (Northern Ireland) 1952 to 1954 means the Statute Law Revision Acts (Northern Ireland) 1952 and 1953, and the Statute Law Revision Act (Northern Ireland) 1954.

The Short Titles Act (Northern Ireland) 1951 and the Repeal of Unnecessary Laws Act (Northern Ireland) 1953 also contribute to the revision of the statute book in Northern Ireland.

=== Isle of Man ===
The following act of the Parliament of the United Kingdom repealed enactments extending to the Isle of Man:

- The Statute Law Revision (Isle of Man) Act 1991 (c. 61)

=== The Westbury saving ===
The Westbury saving, named for its proponent Lord Westbury, was an increasingly complex saving provision that was included in all Statute Law Revision Acts from 1861 until 1953, and which reached its final standardised form in the Statute Law Revision (No. 2) Act 1888. The reason for its inclusion was as a precautionary measure, intended to prevent any substantive changes to the law arising out of any repeals and to confine the acts to the administrative function of clearing dead wood from the statute book. As well as explicitly preventing any repeal from affecting the interpretation of any statute still in force, it also retained any right, benefit, claim, liability, principle of law and court jurisdiction that had previously arisen under a repealed act. This was much broader than the general saving provisions that had been introduced in 1850 that applied to all repeals.

The enactments described in the schedule to this Act are hereby repealed, subject to the provisions of this Act and subject to the exceptions and qualifications in the said schedule mentioned; and every part of a title, preamble, or recital specified after the words "in part, namely," in connexion with an Act mentioned in the said schedule may be omitted from any revised edition of the statutes published by authority after the passing of this Act, and there may be added in the said edition such brief statement of the Acts, officers, persons, and things mentioned in the title, preamble, or recital, as may in consequence of such omission appear necessary:

Provided as follows:—
The repeal of any words or expressions of enactment described in the said schedule shall not affect the binding force, operation, or construction of any statute, or of any part of a statute, whether as respects the past or the future;
and where any enactment not comprised in the said schedule has been repealed, confirmed, revived, or perpetuated by any enactment hereby repealed, such repeal, confirmation, revivor, or perpetuation shall not be affected by the repeal effected by this Act;
and the repeal by this Act of any enactment or schedule shall not affect any enactment in which such enactment or schedule has been applied, incorporated, or referred to;
nor shall such repeal of any enactment affect any right to any hereditary revenues of the Crown, or affect any charges thereupon or prevent any such enactment from being put in force for the collection of any such revenues, or otherwise in relation thereto;
and this Act shall not affect the validity, invalidity, effect, or consequences of anything already done or suffered,—or any existing status or capacity,—or any right, title, obligation, or liability, already acquired, accrued, or incurred, or any remedy or proceeding in respect thereof,—or any release or discharge of or from any debt, penalty, obligation, liability, claim, or demand,—or any indemnity,—or the proof of any past act or thing;
nor shall this Act affect any principle or rule of law or equity, or established jurisdiction, form or course of pleading, practice, or procedure, or the general or public nature of any statute, or any existing usage, franchise, liberty, custom, privilege, restriction, exemption, office, appointment, payment, allowance, emolument, or benefit, or any prospective right, notwithstanding that the same respectively may have been in any manner affirmed, recognised, or derived by, in, or from any enactment hereby repealed;
nor shall this Act revive or restore any jurisdiction, office, duty, drawback, fee, payment, franchise, liberty, custom, liability, right, title, privilege, restriction, exemption, usage, practice, procedure, form of punishment, or other matter or thing not now existing or in force;
and this Act shall not extend to repeal any enactment so far as the same may be in force in any part of His Majesty's dominions out of the United Kingdom, except where otherwise expressed in the said schedule.

— Statute Law Revision Act 1908 (8 Edw. 7. c. 49) s. 1

Although the Interpretation Act 1889 greatly expanded the 1850 general saving provision, the Westbury saving continued to be inserted into Statute Law Revision Acts, as the 1889 act did not provide that any principle of law or court jurisdiction arising under an act would be retained on its repeal. However, the Westbury saving's complexity and wide reach gave it a reputation for making the law uncertain and inaccessible (due to the fact that the repealed provisions would not be included in any revised edition of the statutes). As a result, it was not included in any act after the Statute Law Revision Act 1953, as any extension beyond the provisions of the 1889 act was considered undesirable.

Although the 1889 act has now been repealed, its general saving provision has been incorporated into the Interpretation Act 1978.

== Republic of Ireland ==
=== Pre-2005 ===
- The Fisheries (Statute Law Revision) Act 1949 (No 27)
- The Fisheries (Statute Law Revision) Act 1956 (No 28)
- The Statute Law Revision (Pre-Union Irish Statutes) Act 1962 (No 29)
- The Statute Law Revision Act 1983 (No 11)

=== Enacted between 2005 and 2016 as part of the Statute Law Revision Programme ===
The following statutes have been enacted under the Statute Law Revision Programme:

- The Statute Law Revision (Pre-1922) Act 2005 (No 32)
- The Statute Law Revision Act 2007 (No 28)
- The Statute Law Revision Act 2009 (No 46)
- The Statute Law Revision Act 2012 (No 19)
- The Statute Law Revision Act 2015 (No 23)
- The Statute Law Revision Act 2016 (No 20)
- The Statute Law Revision Act 2025 (No 10)

== Antigua ==
- The Statute Law Revision Ordinance, 1919

== Australia ==
=== Federal legislation ===
- The Statute Law Revision Act 1934 (No. 45)
- The Statute Law Revision Act 1950 (No. 80)
- The Statute Law Revision (Decimal Currency) Act 1966 (No. 93)
- The Statute Law Revision (Decimal Currency) Act 1967 (No. 3)
- The Statute Law Revision Act 1973 (No. 216)
- The Statute Law Revision Act 1974 (No. 20) ComLaw
- The Statute Law Revision Act 1981 (No. 61)
- The Statute Law Revision Act 1996 (No. 43) ComLaw
- The Statute Law Revision Act 2002 (No. 63) ComLaw
- The Statute Law Revision Act 2005 (No 100)
- The Statute Law Revision Act 2006 (No 9) ComLaw
- The Statute Law Revision Act 2007 (No. 8) ComLaw
- The Statute Law Revision Act 2008 (No. 73)
- The Statute Law Revision Act 2010 (No. 8)
- The Statute Law Revision Act 2011 (No. 5)
- The Statute Law Revision Act 2012 (No. 136)
- The Statute Law Revision Act 2013 (No. 103)
- The Statute Law Revision (No. 1) Act 2014 (No. 31)
- The Statute Law Revision (No. 1) Act 2015 (No. 5)
- The Statute Law Revision (No. 2) Act 2015 (No. 145)
- The Statute Law Revision Act 2016 (No. 4)
- The Statute Law Revision (Spring 2016) Act 2016 (No. 67)

=== Australian Capital Territory ===
- The Statute Law Revision (Miscellaneous Provisions) Act 1992 (No. 23)
- The Statute Law Revision (Miscellaneous Provisions) Act 1993 (No. 1)
- The Statute Law Revision Act 1994 (No. 26)
- The Statute Law Revision Act 1995 (No. 46)
- The Statute Law Revision (Penalties) Act 1994 (No. 81)
- The Statute Law Revision (Penalties) Act 1998 (No. 54)

=== New South Wales ===
- The Statute Law Revision Act 1898 (No 28)
- The Statute Law Revision Act 1924 (No 34)
- The Statute Law Revision Act 1937 (No 35)
- The Statute Law Revision Act 1976 (No 63)
- The Statute Law Revision (Local Government) Act 1995 (No 11)

=== Northern Territory ===
- The Statute Law Revision Act 1995 (No. 14)
- The Statute Law Revision Act 2005 (No. 44)
- The Statute Law Revision Act 2007 (No. 4)
- The Statute Law Revision Act 2008 (No. 6)
- The Statute Law Revision Act 2009 (No. 25)
- The Statute Law Revision Act 2010 (No. 29)
- The Statute Law Revision Act 2011 (No. 30)

=== South Australia ===
- The Statute Law Revision Act 2003 (No 44)
- The Statute Law Revision Act 2008 (No 9)

=== Tasmania ===
- The Statute Law Revision (Penalties) Act 1995 (No 35)
- The Statute Law Revision (Repeals) Act 2000 (No 27)
- The Statute Law Revision Act 2003 (No 9)

=== Victoria ===
- The Statute Law Revision Act 1891 (No. 1236)
- The Statute Law Revision Act 1893 (No. 1348)
- The Statute Law Revision Act 1916 (No. 2875)
- The Statute Law Revision Act 1929 (No. 3816)
- The Statute Law Revision Act 1930 (No. 3943)
- The Statute Law Revision Act 1933 (No. 4191)
- The Statute Law Revision Act 1934 (No. 4264)
- The Statute Law Revision Act 1937 (No. 4485)
- The Statute Law Revision Act 1939 (No. 4636)
- The Statute Law Revision Act 1940 (No. 4726)
- The Statute Law Revision Act 1941 (No. 4840)
- The Statute Law Revision Act 1947 (No. 5217)
- The Statute Law Revision Act 1948 (No. 5331)
- The Statute Law Revision Act 1951 (No. 5602)
- The Statute Law Revision Act 1953 (No. 5753)
- The Statute Law Revision Act 1955 (No. 5896)
- The Statute Law Revision Act 1957 (No. 6112)
- The Statute Law Revision Act 1959 (No. 6547)
- The Statute Law Revision Act 1960 (No. 6716)
- The Statute Law Revision Act 1961 (No. 6759)
- The Statute Law Revision Act 1962 (No. 6867)
- The Statute Law (Further Revision) Act 1962 (No. 6961)
- The Statute Law Revision Act 1963 (No. 7065)
- The Statute Law Revision Act 1964 (No. 7142)
- The Statute Law Revision Act 1965 (No. 7332)
- The Statute Law Revision Act 1971 (No. 8181)
- The Statute Law Revision Act 1977 (No. 9059)
- The Statute Law Revision Act 1980 (No. 9427)
- The Statute Law Revision Act 1981 (No. 9549)
- The Statute Law Revision (Repeals) Act 1982 (No. 9863)
- The Statute Law Revision Act 1983 (No. 9902)
- The Statute Law Revision Act 1984 (No. 10087)
- The Statute Law Revision Act 1995 (No. 11 of 1995)
- The Statute Law Revision (Marine) Act 1996 (No. 27 of 1996)
- The Arts Acts (Statute Law Revision) Act 1998 (No. 5 of 1998)
- The Health Acts (Statute Law Revision) Act 1998 (No. 12 of 1998)
- The Statute Law Revision (Repeals) Act 1999 (No. 3 of 1999)
- The Statute Law Revision Act 2000 (No. 74 of 2000)
- The Statute Law Revision Act 2005 (No. 10 of 2005)
- The Statute Law Revision Act 2007 (No. 28 of 2007)
- The Personal Property Securities (Statute Law Revision and Implementation) Act 2010 (No. 74 of 2010)
- The Statute Law Revision Act 2011 (No. 29 of 2011)
- The Statute Law Repeals Act 2012 (No. 30 of 2012)
- The Statute Law Revision Act 2012 (No. 43 of 2012)
- The Statute Law Revision Act 2013 (No. 70 of 2013)
- The Statute Law Revision Act 2015 (No. 21 of 2015)
- The Statute Law Repeals Act 2017 (No. 17 of 2017)
- The Statute Law Revision Act 2024 (No. 13 of 2024)
- The Statute Law Repeals Act 2025 (No. 3 of 2025)
- The Statute Law Revision Act 2025 (No. 41 of 2025)

Statute Law Revision Committee Act

- The Statute Law Revision Committee Act 1916 (No. 2876)
- The Statute Law Revision Committee Act 1948 (No. 5285)
- The Statute Law Revision Committee (Amendment) Act 1953 (No. 5737)
- The Statute Law Revision Committee (Amendment) Act 1955 (No. 5855)

=== Western Australia ===
- The Statute Law Revision Act 1964 (No. 61)
- The Statute Law Revision Act 1965 (No. 57)
- The Statute Law Revision Act (No. 2) 1965 (No. 58)
- The Statute Law Revision Act 1966 (No. 79)
- The Statute Law Revision Act (No. 2) 1966 (No. 80)
- The Statute Law Revision (Short Titles) Act 1966 (No. 81)
- The Statute Law Revision Act 1967 (No. 68)
- The Statute Law Revision Act 1970 (No. 10)
- The Statute Law Revision Act 2006 (No. 37)

== Barbados ==
- The Statute Law Revision Act, 1893
- The Statute Law Revision Act (No 2) 1912

== Bermuda ==
- The Statute Law Revision Act, 1902 (No 55)
- The Statute Law Revision Act, 1907 (No 15)
- The Statute Law Revision Act, 1953 (No 72)

== Canada ==
=== Ontario ===
- The Statute Law Revision Act, 1902 (2 Edw 7 c 1)

== Ghana ==
- The Statute Law Revision Act, 1963 (Act 215)
- The Statute Law Revision Decree, 1969 (NLCD 355)
- The Statute Law Revision Act, 1971 (Act 368)
- The Statute Law Revision Decree 1973 (NRCD 184)
- The Statute Law Revision (No. 2) Decree 1973 (NRCD 228)
- The Statute Law Revision Law, 1992 (PNDCL 295)
- The Statute Law Revision Law, 1993 (PNDCL 323)
- The Statute Law Revision Act, 1996 (Act 516)
- The Statute Law Revision Act, 1997 (Act 543)

== South Africa ==
- The Pre-Union Statute Law Revision Act, 1967 (No 78)
- The Pre-Union Statute Law Revision Act, 1968 (No 44)
- The Pre-Union Statute Law Revision Act, 1970 (No 42)
- The Pre-Union Statute Law Revision Act, 1976 (No 36)
- The Pre-Union Statute Law Revision Act, 1977 (No 43)
- The Pre-Union Statute Law Revision Act, 1979 (No 24)

=== Cape ===
- The Cape Statute Law Revision Act, 1934 (No 25)
- The Cape Statute Law Revision Amendment Act, 1939 (No 32)

=== Orange Free State ===
- The Orange Free State Statute Law Revision Act 1936 (No 33)

== See also ==
- List of short titles
- Desuetude
- Law Reform Act
- Statute Law (Repeals) Act
