= List of acts of the Parliament of Victoria =

This is an incomplete list of acts of the Parliament of Victoria.

== 19th century ==
=== 1850-1859 ===
Acts of the original unicameral Legislative Council were numbered within each regnal year.

- List of acts of the Legislative Council of Victoria from 1851 (15 Vict. Nos. 1-8)
- List of acts of the Legislative Council of Victoria from 1852 (15 Vict. Nos. 9-15; 16 Vict. Nos. 1-23)
- List of acts of the Legislative Council of Victoria from 1853 (16 Vict. Nos. 24-40; 17 Vict. Nos. 1-5)
- List of acts of the Legislative Council of Victoria from 1854 (17 Vict. Nos. 7-31; 18 Vict. Nos. 1-15)
- List of acts of the Legislative Council of Victoria from 1855 (18 Vict. Nos. 16-44; 19 Vict. No. 1)
- List of acts of the Legislative Council of Victoria from 1856 (19 Vict. Nos. 2-21)

Acts of the new Parliament of Victoria were numbered sequentially, from 1, until the end of 1985.

- List of acts of the Parliament of Victoria from 1857 (Nos. 1-44)
- List of acts of the Parliament of Victoria from 1858 (Nos. 45-65)
- List of acts of the Parliament of Victoria from 1859 (Nos. 66-91)

=== 1860-1869 ===
- List of acts of the Parliament of Victoria from 1860 (Nos. 92-119)
- List of acts of the Parliament of Victoria from 1861 (Nos. 120-130)
- List of acts of the Parliament of Victoria from 1862 (Nos. 131-162)
- List of acts of the Parliament of Victoria from 1863 (Nos. 163-189)
- List of acts of the Parliament of Victoria from 1864 (Nos. 188-233) (Note: Major consolidation of previous acts took place in this year.)
- List of acts of the Parliament of Victoria from 1865 (Nos. 234-292)
- List of acts of the Parliament of Victoria from 1866 (Nos. 293-301)
- List of acts of the Parliament of Victoria from 1867 (Nos. 302-325)
- List of acts of the Parliament of Victoria from 1868 (Nos. 326-335)
- List of acts of the Parliament of Victoria from 1869 (Nos. 336-360)

=== 1870-1879 ===
- List of acts of the Parliament of Victoria from 1870 (Nos. 361-390)
- List of acts of the Parliament of Victoria from 1871 (Nos. 391-416)
- List of acts of the Parliament of Victoria from 1872 (Nos. 417-452)
- List of acts of the Parliament of Victoria from 1873 (Nos. 453-480)
- List of acts of the Parliament of Victoria from 1874 (Nos. 481-506)
- List of acts of the Parliament of Victoria from 1875 (Nos. 507-515)
- List of acts of the Parliament of Victoria from 1876 (Nos. 516-566)
- List of acts of the Parliament of Victoria from 1877 (Nos. 567-592)
- List of acts of the Parliament of Victoria from 1878 (Nos. 593-634)
- List of acts of the Parliament of Victoria from 1879 (Nos. 635-649)

=== 1880-1889 ===
- List of acts of the Parliament of Victoria from 1880 (Nos. 650-685)
- List of acts of the Parliament of Victoria from 1881 (Nos. 686-724)
- List of acts of the Parliament of Victoria from 1882 (Nos. 725-744)
- List of acts of the Parliament of Victoria from 1883 (Nos. 745-788)
- List of acts of the Parliament of Victoria from 1884 (Nos. 787-831)
- List of acts of the Parliament of Victoria from 1885 (Nos. 832-875)
- List of acts of the Parliament of Victoria from 1886 (Nos. 876-915)
- List of acts of the Parliament of Victoria from 1887 (Nos. 916-963)
- List of acts of the Parliament of Victoria from 1888 (Nos. 964-1011)
- List of acts of the Parliament of Victoria from 1889 (Nos. 1012-1055)

=== 1890-1899 ===
- List of acts of the Parliament of Victoria from 1890 (Nos. 1056-1203)
- List of acts of the Parliament of Victoria from 1891 (Nos. 1204-1252)
- List of acts of the Parliament of Victoria from 1892 (Nos. 1253-1283)
- List of acts of the Parliament of Victoria from 1893 (Nos. 1284-1356)
- List of acts of the Parliament of Victoria from 1894 (Nos. 1357-1367)
- List of acts of the Parliament of Victoria from 1895 (Nos. 1368-1410)
- List of acts of the Parliament of Victoria from 1896 (Nos. 1411-1482)
- List of acts of the Parliament of Victoria from 1897 (Nos. 1483-1542)
- List of acts of the Parliament of Victoria from 1898 (Nos. 1543-1602)
- List of acts of the Parliament of Victoria from 1899 (Nos. 1603-1626)

== 20th century ==
=== 1900-1909 ===
- List of acts of the Parliament of Victoria from 1900 (Nos. 1627-1722)
- List of acts of the Parliament of Victoria from 1901 (Nos. 1723-1781)
- List of acts of the Parliament of Victoria from 1902 (Nos. 1782-1813)
- List of acts of the Parliament of Victoria from 1903 (Nos. 1814-1896)
- List of acts of the Parliament of Victoria from 1904 (Nos. 1897-1962)
- List of acts of the Parliament of Victoria from 1905 (Nos. 1963-2016)
- List of acts of the Parliament of Victoria from 1906 (Nos. 2017-2074)
- List of acts of the Parliament of Victoria from 1907 (Nos. 2075-2138)
- List of acts of the Parliament of Victoria from 1908 (Nos. 2139-2156)
- List of acts of the Parliament of Victoria from 1909 (Nos. 2157-2215)

=== 1910-1919 ===
- List of acts of the Parliament of Victoria from 1910 (Nos. 2216-2284)
- List of acts of the Parliament of Victoria from 1911 (Nos. 2285-2347)
- List of acts of the Parliament of Victoria from 1912 (Nos. 2348-2449)
- List of acts of the Parliament of Victoria from 1913 (Nos. 2450-2477)
- List of acts of the Parliament of Victoria from 1914 (Nos. 2478-2577)
- List of acts of the Parliament of Victoria from 1915 (Nos. 2578-2819)
- List of acts of the Parliament of Victoria from 1916 (Nos. 2820-2888)
- List of acts of the Parliament of Victoria from 1917 (Nos. 2889-2930) incomplete
- List of acts of the Parliament of Victoria from 1918 (Nos. 2931-2994)
- List of acts of the Parliament of Victoria from 1919 (Nos. 2995-3040)

=== 1920-1929 ===
- List of acts of the Parliament of Victoria from 1920 (Nos. 3041-3117-?) incomplete
- List of acts of the Parliament of Victoria from 1921 (Nos. ?-3120-3170-?) incomplete
- List of acts of the Parliament of Victoria from 1922 (Nos. ?-3177-3258-?) incomplete
- List of acts of the Parliament of Victoria from 1923 (Nos. ?-3270-3336-?) incomplete
- List of acts of the Parliament of Victoria from 1924 (Nos. ?-3338-3380-?) incomplete
- List of acts of the Parliament of Victoria from 1925 (Nos. ?-3391-3440-?) incomplete
- List of acts of the Parliament of Victoria from 1926 (Nos. ?-3442-3500-?) incomplete
- List of acts of the Parliament of Victoria from 1927 (Nos. ?-3502-3578) incomplete
- List of acts of the Parliament of Victoria from 1928 (Nos. 3579-3620)
- List of acts of the Parliament of Victoria from 1929 (Nos. 3621-3852)

=== 1930-1939 ===
- List of acts of the Parliament of Victoria from 1930 (Nos. 3853-3949-?) incomplete
- List of acts of the Parliament of Victoria from 1931 (Nos. ?-3951-4017-?) incomplete
- List of acts of the Parliament of Victoria from 1932 (Nos. ?-4014-4097-?) incomplete
- List of acts of the Parliament of Victoria from 1933 (Nos. ?-4107-4204-?) incomplete
- List of acts of the Parliament of Victoria from 1934 (Nos. ?-4209-4278-?) incomplete
- List of acts of the Parliament of Victoria from 1935 (Nos. ?-4280-4357-?) incomplete
- List of acts of the Parliament of Victoria from 1936 (Nos. ?-4362-4465) incomplete
- List of acts of the Parliament of Victoria from 1937 (Nos. 4466-4532) incomplete
- List of acts of the Parliament of Victoria from 1938 (Nos. 4533-4623-?) incomplete
- List of acts of the Parliament of Victoria from 1939 (Nos. ?-4631-4720-?) incomplete

=== 1940-1949 ===
- List of acts of the Parliament of Victoria from 1940 (Nos. ?-4726-4782-?) incomplete
- List of acts of the Parliament of Victoria from 1941 (Nos. ?-4798-4879) incomplete
- List of acts of the Parliament of Victoria from 1942 (Nos. 4880-4941-?) incomplete
- List of acts of the Parliament of Victoria from 1943 (Nos. ?-4943-4998) incomplete
- List of acts of the Parliament of Victoria from 1944 (Nos. 4999-5055-?) incomplete
- List of acts of the Parliament of Victoria from 1945 (Nos. ?-5061-5108-?) incomplete
- List of acts of the Parliament of Victoria from 1946 (Nos. ?-5120-5205-?) incomplete
- List of acts of the Parliament of Victoria from 1947 (Nos. ?-5207-5262-?) incomplete
- List of acts of the Parliament of Victoria from 1948 (Nos. ?-5268-5360-?) incomplete
- List of acts of the Parliament of Victoria from 1949 (Nos. ?-5364-5447-?) incomplete

=== 1950-1959 ===
- List of acts of the Parliament of Victoria from 1950 (Nos. ?-5451-5527-?) incomplete
- List of acts of the Parliament of Victoria from 1951 (Nos. ?-5528-5619) incomplete
- List of acts of the Parliament of Victoria from 1952 (Nos. 5620-5663)
- List of acts of the Parliament of Victoria from 1953 (Nos. 5664-5772-?) incomplete
- List of acts of the Parliament of Victoria from 1954 (Nos. ?-5778-5853-?) incomplete
- List of acts of the Parliament of Victoria from 1955 (Nos. ?-5854-5939-?) incomplete
- List of acts of the Parliament of Victoria from 1956 (Nos. ?-5942-6056) incomplete
- List of acts of the Parliament of Victoria from 1957 (Nos. 6057-6170) incomplete
- List of acts of the Parliament of Victoria from 1958 (Nos. 6171-6487)
- List of acts of the Parliament of Victoria from 1959 (Nos. 6488-6606) incomplete

=== 1960-1969 ===
- List of acts of the Parliament of Victoria from 1960 (Nos. 6607-6735-?) incomplete
- List of acts of the Parliament of Victoria from 1961 (Nos. ?-6740-6850-?) incomplete
- List of acts of the Parliament of Victoria from 1962 (Nos. ?-6852-6977) incomplete
- List of acts of the Parliament of Victoria from 1963 (Nos. 6978-7104-?) incomplete
- List of acts of the Parliament of Victoria from 1964 (Nos. ?-7109-7203-?) incomplete
- List of acts of the Parliament of Victoria from 1965 (Nos. ?-7242-7365-?) incomplete
- List of acts of the Parliament of Victoria from 1966 (Nos. ?-7372-7514-?) incomplete
- List of acts of the Parliament of Victoria from 1967 (Nos. ?-7518-7655-?) incomplete
- List of acts of the Parliament of Victoria from 1968 (Nos. ?-7673-7785-?) incomplete
- List of acts of the Parliament of Victoria from 1969 (Nos. ?-7790-7932-?) incomplete

=== 1970-1979 ===
- List of acts of the Parliament of Victoria from 1970 (Nos. ?-7937-8089-?) incomplete
- List of acts of the Parliament of Victoria from 1971 (Nos. ?-8098-8241-?) incomplete
- List of acts of the Parliament of Victoria from 1972 (Nos. ?-8243-8383-?) incomplete
- List of acts of the Parliament of Victoria from 1973 (Nos. ?-8404-8528-?) incomplete
- List of acts of the Parliament of Victoria from 1974 (Nos. ?-8540-8661-?) incomplete
- List of acts of the Parliament of Victoria from 1975 (Nos. ?-8668-8825-?) incomplete
- List of acts of the Parliament of Victoria from 1976 (Nos. ?-8874-8968-?) incomplete
- List of acts of the Parliament of Victoria from 1977 (Nos. ?-8976-9083) incomplete
- List of acts of the Parliament of Victoria from 1978 (Nos. 9084-9249-?) incomplete
- List of acts of the Parliament of Victoria from 1979 (Nos. ?-9251-9365) incomplete

=== 1980-1989 ===
- List of acts of the Parliament of Victoria from 1980 (Nos. 9366-9514) incomplete
- List of acts of the Parliament of Victoria from 1981 (Nos. 9515-9681)
- List of acts of the Parliament of Victoria from 1982 (Nos. 9682-9850)
- List of acts of the Parliament of Victoria from 1983 (Nos. 9851-10029)
- List of acts of the Parliament of Victoria from 1984 (Nos. 10030-10171) incomplete
- List of acts of the Parliament of Victoria from 1985 (Nos. 10172-10262)

From 1 January 1986, the Interpretation of Legislation (Further Amendment) Act 1985 (No. 10214) changed the citation system so that acts were numbered within each calendar year.

- List of acts of the Parliament of Victoria from 1986
- List of acts of the Parliament of Victoria from 1987 incomplete
- List of acts of the Parliament of Victoria from 1988 incomplete
- List of acts of the Parliament of Victoria from 1989 incomplete

=== 1990-1999 ===
- List of acts of the Parliament of Victoria from 1990 incomplete
- List of acts of the Parliament of Victoria from 1991 incomplete
- List of acts of the Parliament of Victoria from 1992 incomplete
- List of acts of the Parliament of Victoria from 1993 incomplete
- List of acts of the Parliament of Victoria from 1994 incomplete
- List of acts of the Parliament of Victoria from 1995 incomplete
- List of acts of the Parliament of Victoria from 1996 incomplete
- List of acts of the Parliament of Victoria from 1997 incomplete
- List of acts of the Parliament of Victoria from 1998 incomplete
- List of acts of the Parliament of Victoria from 1999 incomplete

== 21st century ==
=== 2000-2009 ===
- List of acts of the Parliament of Victoria from 2000 incomplete
- List of acts of the Parliament of Victoria from 2001 incomplete
- List of acts of the Parliament of Victoria from 2002 incomplete
- List of acts of the Parliament of Victoria from 2003 incomplete
- List of acts of the Parliament of Victoria from 2004 incomplete
- List of acts of the Parliament of Victoria from 2005 incomplete
- List of acts of the Parliament of Victoria from 2006 incomplete
- List of acts of the Parliament of Victoria from 2007 incomplete
- List of acts of the Parliament of Victoria from 2008 incomplete
- List of acts of the Parliament of Victoria from 2009 incomplete

=== 2010-2019 ===
- List of acts of the Parliament of Victoria from 2010 incomplete
- List of acts of the Parliament of Victoria from 2011 incomplete
- List of acts of the Parliament of Victoria from 2012 incomplete
- List of acts of the Parliament of Victoria from 2013 incomplete
- List of acts of the Parliament of Victoria from 2014 incomplete
- List of acts of the Parliament of Victoria from 2015 incomplete
- List of acts of the Parliament of Victoria from 2016 incomplete
- List of acts of the Parliament of Victoria from 2017 incomplete
- List of acts of the Parliament of Victoria from 2018 incomplete
- List of acts of the Parliament of Victoria from 2019 incomplete

=== 2020- ===
- List of acts of the Parliament of Victoria from 2020 incomplete
- List of acts of the Parliament of Victoria from 2021 incomplete
- List of acts of the Parliament of Victoria from 2022 incomplete
- List of acts of the Parliament of Victoria from 2023 incomplete
- List of acts of the Parliament of Victoria from 2024 incomplete
- List of acts of the Parliament of Victoria from 2025 incomplete
- List of acts of the Parliament of Victoria from 2026

== See also ==
- Victorian Legislative Council
- Parliament of Victoria
