= List of acts of the Parliament of Victoria from 2015 =

This is a list of acts of the Parliament of Victoria, Australia for the year 2015.

== 2015 ==
Short title, or popular name	Citation	Royal assent
Long title
Education and Training Reform Amendment (Funding of Non-Government Schools) Act 2015	No. 1 of 2015	10 March 2015
An Act to amend the Education and Training Reform Act 2006 (Note: Education and Training Reform Act 2006 (No. 24 of 2006)) to establish a transparent mechanism for State funding of non-Government schools and for other purposes.
Wrongs Amendment (Asbestos Related Claims) Act 2015	No. 2 of 2015	
Back to Work Act 2015	No. 3 of 2015	
Cemeteries and Crematoria Amendment (Veterans Reform) Act 2015	No. 4 of 2015	
Interpretation of Legislation Amendment Act 2015	No. 5 of 2015	
Summary Offences Amendment (Move-on Laws) Act 2015	No. 6 of 2015	
Education and Training Reform Amendment (Child Safe Schools) Act 2015	No. 7 of 2015	
Legal Profession Uniform Law Application Amendment Act 2015	No. 8 of 2015	
Limitation of Actions Amendment (Child Abuse) Act 2015	No. 9 of 2015	
Parliamentary Committees and Inquiries Acts Amendment Act 2015	No. 10 of 2015	
Public Health and Wellbeing Amendment (Hairdressing Registration) Act 2015	No. 11 of 2015	
Veterans and Other Acts Amendment Act 2015	No. 12 of 2015	
Domestic Animals Amendment Act 2015	No. 13 of 2015	
Jury Directions Act 2015	No. 14 of 2015	12 May 2015
An Act to simplify and clarify the law on jury directions in criminal trials and for other purposes.
Mental Health Amendment Act 2015	No. 15 of 2015	
National Parks Amendment (Prohibiting Cattle Grazing) Act 2015	No. 16 of 2015	
Crimes Amendment (Repeal of Section 19A) Act 2015	No. 17 of 2015	
Regional Development Victoria Amendment (Jobs and Infrastructure) Act 2015	No. 18 of 2015	
Sentencing Amendment (Correction of Sentencing Error) Act 2015	No. 19 of 2015	
Justice Legislation Amendment Act 2015	No. 20 of 2015	
Statute Law Revision Act 2015 (repealed)	No. 21 of 2015	16 June 2015
An Act to revise the statute law of Victoria. (Repealed by Statute Law Revision Act 2015 (No. 21 of 2015))
Wrongs Amendment (Prisoner Related Compensation) Act 2015	No. 22 of 2015	
Appropriation (2015-2016) Act 2015	No. 23 of 2015	29 June 2015
An Act for the appropriation of certain sums out of the Consolidated Fund for the ordinary annual services of the Government for the financial year 2015/2016 and for other purposes.
Appropriation (Parliament 2015-2016) Act 2015	No. 24 of 2015	29 June 2015
An Act for the appropriation of certain sums out of the Consolidated Fund for the Parliament in respect of the financial year 2015/2016 and for other purposes.
Court Services Victoria and Other Acts Amendment Act 2015	No. 25 of 2015	
State Taxation Acts Amendment Act 2015	No. 26 of 2015	
Children, Youth and Families Amendment (Restrictions on the Making of Protection Orders) Act 2015	No. 27 of 2015	
Energy Legislation Amendment (Publication of Retail Offers) Act 2015	No. 28 of 2015	
Judicial Entitlements Act 2015	No. 29 of 2015	11 August 2015
An Act to modernise the processes and structures for determining salaries, allowances and conditions of service for judicial officers, to repeal the Judicial Salaries Act 2004 (Note: Judicial Salaries Act 2004 (No. 38 of 2004)) and the Judicial Remuneration Tribunal Act 1995, (Note: Judicial Remuneration Tribunal Act 1995 (No. 22 of 1995)) to make consequential and miscellaneous amendments to other Acts and for other purposes.
Planning and Environment Amendment (Recognising Objectors) Act 2015	No. 30 of 2015	
Victoria Police Amendment (Validation) Act 2015	No. 31 of 2015	
Adoption Amendment Act 2015	No. 32 of 2015	
Associations Incorporation Reform Amendment (Electronic Transactions) Act 2015	No. 33 of 2015	
Road Safety Amendment (Private Car Parks) Act 2015	No. 34 of 2015	
Planning and Environment Amendment (Infrastructure Contributions) Act 2015	No. 35 of 2015	
Classification (Publications, Films and Computer Games) (Enforcement) Amendment Act 2015	No. 36 of 2015	
Education and Training Reform Amendment (Miscellaneous) Act 2015	No. 37 of 2015	
Infrastructure Victoria Act 2015	No. 38 of 2015	8 September 2015
An Act to establish Infrastructure Victoria to provide independent and expert advice about Victoria's infrastructure needs and priorities, to establish a new strategic infrastructure planning process and to amend the Public Administration Act 2004 (Note: Public Administration Act 2004 (No. 108 of 2004)) and for other purposes.
Local Government Legislation Amendment (Environmental Upgrade Agreements) Act 2015	No. 39 of 2015	
Road Safety Amendment Act 2015	No. 40 of 2015	
Corrections Legislation Amendment Act 2015	No. 41 of 2015	
Crimes Amendment (Child Pornography and Other Matters) Act 2015	No. 42 of 2015	
Emergency Management (Control of Response Activities and Other Matters) Act 2015	No. 43 of 2015	
Firearms Amendment (Trafficking and Other Measures) Act 2015	No. 44 of 2015	
Heavy Vehicles Legislation Amendment Act 2015	No. 45 of 2015	
National Electricity (Victoria) Amendment Act 2015	No. 46 of 2015	
Resources Legislation Amendment Act 2015	No. 47 of 2015	
Criminal Organisations Control Amendment (Unlawful Associations) Act 2015	No. 48 of 2015	
Energy Legislation Amendment (Consumer Protection) Act 2015	No. 49 of 2015	
Racing Amendment Act 2015	No. 50 of 2015	
Safe Patient Care (Nurse to Patient and Midwife to Patient Ratios) Act 2015	No. 51 of 2015	13 October 2015
An Act to specify requirements that the operators of certain publicly funded health facilities staff certain wards with a minimum number of nurses or midwives, to provide for the reporting of compliance with, and enforcement of, those requirements and for other purposes.
Serious Sex Offenders (Detention and Supervision) and Other Acts Amendment Act 2015	No. 52 of 2015	
Local Government Amendment (Improved Governance) Act 2015	No. 53 of 2015	
National Parks Amendment (No 99 Year Leases) Act 2015	No. 54 of 2015	27 October 2015
An Act to amend the National Parks Act 1975 (Note: National Parks Act 1975 (No. 8702)) to repeal section 19I of that Act to remove the power to grant a lease of any land that may be leased under section 19G of that Act for a term of more than 21 years and not exceeding 99 years and to reduce the maximum term of a lease that may be granted for specific areas of land in specified parks from 99 years to 50 years and for other purposes.
Public Health and Wellbeing Amendment (No Jab, No Play) Act 2015	No. 55 of 2015	27 October 2015
Victims of Crime Commissioner Act 2015	No. 56 of 2015	27 October 2015
An Act to establish the Victims of Crime Commissioner and the Victims of Crime Consultative Committee and for other purposes.
Children, Youth and Families Amendment (Aboriginal Principal Officers) Act 2015	No. 57 of 2015	
Gambling Legislation Amendment Act 2015	No. 58 of 2015	
Justice Legislation Amendment (Police Custody Officers) Act 2015	No. 59 of 2015	
Prevention of Cruelty to Animals Amendment Act 2015	No. 60 of 2015	
Victorian Energy Efficiency Target Amendment (Saving Energy, Growing Jobs) Act 2015	No. 61 of 2015	
Wrongs Amendment Act 2015	No. 62 of 2015	
Child Wellbeing and Safety Amendment (Child Safe Standards) Act 2015	No. 63 of 2015	
Fisheries Amendment Act 2015	No. 64 of 2015	
Local Government Amendment (Fair Go Rates) Act 2015	No. 65 of 2015	
Public Health and Wellbeing Amendment (Safe Access Zones) Act 2015	No. 66 of 2015	
State Taxation Acts Further Amendment Act 2015	No. 67 of 2015	
Adoption Amendment (Adoption by Same-Sex Couples) Act 2015	No. 68 of 2015	
Education Legislation Amendment (TAFE and University Governance Reform) Act 2015	No. 69 of 2015	
Terrorism (Community Protection) Amendment Act 2015	No. 70 of 2015	15 December 2015
An Act to amend the Terrorism (Community Protection) Act 2003 (Note: Terrorism (Community Protection) Act 2003 (No. 7 of 2003)) to provide for the remote entry of premises for the purposes of covert search warrants, to extend the operation of preventative detention orders and prohibited contact orders and for other purposes.

== Sources ==
- "Acts as made: 2015". Victoria Legislation.
