= List of acts of the Parliament of Victoria from 1880 =

This is a list of acts of the Parliament of Victoria, Australia for the year 1880.

== 1880 ==
Continuing the third session of the ninth parliament of Victoria.

Short title, or popular name	Citation	Royal assent
Long title
	43 Vict. No. 650	5 February 1880
An Act to provide for the granting of certain Loans for Water Supply in the country districts for the service of the year ending the thirtieth day of June One thousand eight hundred and eighty.
	43 Vict. No. 651	5 February 1880
An Act to provide for the compulsory taking of Land for the Dunmunkle and St. Arnaud Shires Waterworks.
	43 Vict. No. 652	5 February 1880
An Act to sanction the issue and application of certain Sums of Money from "The Railway Loan Account 1878" for the Survey of State Railways and the Purchase of Permanent-way Materials and Manufacture of Points and Crossings.
Land Acts Amendment Act 1880 (repealed)	43 Vict. No. 653	5 February 1880
An Act to amend the Land Acts 1869 (Note: Land Act 1869 (33 Vict. No. 360)) and 1878. (Note: Land Act 1878 (42 Vict. No. 634)) (Repealed by Land Act 1884 (48 Vict. No. 812)
	43 Vict. No. 654	5 February 1880
An Act to apply a sum out of the Consolidated Revenue to the service of the year ending on the last day of June One thousand eight hundred and eighty and to appropriate the Supplies granted in this Session of Parliament.

The tenth parliament of Victoria.

Short title, or popular name	Citation	Royal assent
Long title
Falsification of Accounts Act 1880 (repealed)	44 Vict. No. 655	25 June 1880
An Act to amend the Law with reference to the Falsification of Accounts. (Repealed by Crimes Act 1890 (54 Vict. No. 1079))
Waterworks Act 1880 (repealed)	44 Vict. No. 656	25 June 1880
An Act to repeal the "Waterworks Commissioners Act 1869," (Note: Waterworks Commissioners Act 1869 (33 Vict. No. 347)) and for other purposes. (Repealed by Water Act 1890 (54 Vict. No. 1156))
	44 Vict. No. 657	25 June 1880
An Act to authorize the construction of Rolling Stock and Works connected with the construction of State Railways and for other purposes.
	44 Vict. No. 658	25 June 1880
An Act to amend the law relating to the payment of the Public Moneys. (Repealed by Audit Act 1890 (54 Vict. No. 1066))

The first session of the eleventh parliament of Victoria.

Short title, or popular name	Citation	Royal assent
Long title
	44 Vict. No. 659	29 July 1880
An Act to apply out of the Consolidated Revenue the sum of Seven hundred and eighteen thousand three hundred pounds (Note: £718,300 in 1880 is equivalent to A$116,600,000 in 2022.) to the service of the year One thousand eight hundred and eighty and eighty-one.
Lancefield Railway Construction Act 1880	44 Vict. No. 660	22 September 1880
An Act to authorize the Construction by the State of a Line of Railway from Lancefield Road to Lancefield.
	44 Vict. No. 661	22 September 1880
An Act to provide for the further suspension of certain Duties of Customs. (Repealed by Duties of Customs Act 1883 (47 Vict. No. 769))
	44 Vict. No. 662	30 September 1880
An Act to authorize the granting of Permits for the Sale of Liquors at the Melbourne International Exhibition 1880.
Treasury Bonds Act 1880	44 Vict. No. 663	30 September 1880
An Act to authorize the issue of Treasury Bonds.
	44 Vict. No. 664	30 September 1880
An Act to apply out of the Consolidated Revenue the sum of Six hundred thousand pounds (Note: £600,000 in 1880 is equivalent to A$97,400,000 in 2022.) to the service of the year One thousand eight hundred and eighty and eighty-one.
Expired Laws Continuance Act 1880	44 Vict. No. 665	5 October 1880
An Act to revive and continue various Expired Laws.
	44 Vict. No. 666	
An Act to provide for reimbursing Members of the Legislative Assembly their expenses in relation to their attendance in Parliament.
Census Act 1880	44 Vict. No. 667	29 October 1880
An Act for taking an account of the Population and of the Live Stock in the year One thousand eight hundred and eighty-one.
Tobacco Act 1880 (repealed)	44 Vict. No. 668	29 October 1880
An Act for imposing a Duty on Victorian manufactured Tobacco, and for regulating the Manufacture of Tobacco in bond. (Repealed by Customs and Excise Duties Act 1890 (54 Vict. No. 1082))
Beer Duty Act 1880	44 Vict. No. 669	29 October 1880
An Act to impose a Duty upon Beer.
	44 Vict. No. 670	29 October 1880
An Act to apply out of the Consolidated Revenue the sum of Five hundred and forty-two thousand pounds (Note: £542,000 in 1880 is equivalent to A$88,000,000 in 2022.) to the service of the year One thousand eight hundred and eighty and eighty-one.
	44 Vict. No. 671	15 November 1880
An Act to amend an Act intituled "An Act to amend 'The Railway Construction Act 1877' (Note: Railway Construction Act 1877 (41 Vict. No. 580)) so far as it relates to the Construction of the Daylesford Railway." (Note: 42 Vict. No. 606)
	44 Vict. No. 672	28 December 1880
An Act to further amend "The Passengers Harbors and Navigation Statute 1865." (Note: Passengers Harbors and Navigation Statute 1865 (28 Vict. No. 255)) (Repealed by Marine Act 1890 (54 Vict. No. 1165))
Dower Abolition Act 1880 (repealed)	44 Vict. No. 673	28 December 1880
An Act to amend the Law relating to Dower. (Repealed by Real Property Act 1890 (54 Vict. No. 1136))
	44 Vict. No. 674	28 December 1880
An Act to provide for the application to Victoria of "The Army Discipline and Regulation Act 1879" (Note: Army Discipline and Regulation Act 1879 (42 & 43 Vict. c. 33 (Imp))) of the Imperial Parliament of Great Britain and Ireland. (Repealed by Defences and Discipline Act 1890 (54 Vict. No. 1083))
Bank of New South Wales Act 1880 (repealed)	44 Vict. No. 675	28 December 1880
An Act to amend an Act (Note: Bank of New South Wales Act 1850 (14 Vict. (NSW))) intituled "An Act to incorporate the proprietors of a certain Banking Company called the 'Bank of New South Wales' and for other purposes therein mentioned" as amended by 'The Bank of New South Wales Act 1871.'" (Note: Bank of New South Wales Act 1871 (35 Vict. No. 396)) (Repealed by Bank of New South Wales Act 1926 (17 Geo. V. No. 3453))
	44 Vict. No. 676	28 December 1880
An Act to apply out of the Consolidated Revenue the sum of Nine hundred and twenty-five thousand pounds (Note: £925,000 in 1880 is equivalent to A$150,100,000 in 2022.) to the service of the year One thousand eight hundred and eighty and eighty-one.
Cemeteries Statute Amendment Act 1880 (repealed)	44 Vict. No. 677	28 December 1880
An Act to amend "The Cemeteries Statute 1864." (Note: Cemeteries Statute 1864 (27 Vict. No. 201)) (Repealed by Cemeteries Act 1890 (54 Vict. No. 1072))
	44 Vict. No. 678	28 December 1880
An Act to amend the Customs Act (Note: Customs Act 1874 (38 Vict. No. 503)) so far as it relates to the establishment of Inland Bonded Warehouses. (Repealed by Customs Act 1883 (47 Vict. No. 768))
	44 Vict. No. 679	28 December 1880
An Act to continue and amend "The Beer Duty Act 1880." (Note: Beer Duty Act 1880 (44 Vict. No. 669))
	44 Vict. No. 680	28 December 1880
An Act to continue and amend "The Tobacco Act 1880." (Note: Tobacco Act 1880 (44 Vict. No. 668))
Land Act 1880 (repealed)	44 Vict. No. 681	28 December 1880
An Act to continue and amend "The Land Act 1869" (Note: Land Act 1869 (33 Vict. No. 360)) and Acts amending the same. (Repealed by Land Act 1884 (48 Vict. No. 812)
Railway Construction Act 1880	44 Vict. No. 682	28 December 1880
An Act to authorize the Construction of certain Lines of Railway by the State.
Rabbit Suppression Act 1880	44 Vict. No. 683	28 December 1880
An Act to provide for the Suppression of Rabbits.
Phylloxera Vine Disease Act 1880 (repealed)	44 Vict. No. 684	28 December 1880
An Act to provide for the Eradication of the "Phylloxera" and other Vine Diseases. (Repealed by Vine Disease Act 1890 (54 Vict. No. 1155))
	44 Vict. No. 685	28 December 1880
An Act to apply out of "The Railway Loan Account 1878" certain sums of money for railway purposes and country waterworks.

== Sources ==
- "1880 Victorian Historical Acts". AustLII.
