= List of acts of the Parliament of Victoria from 1969 =

This is a list of acts of the Parliament of Victoria, Australia for the year 1969.

== 1969 ==
Short title, or popular name	Citation	Royal assent
Long title
Agricultural Education Cadetships Act 1969	No. 7790	15 April 1969
An Act to provide for the Granting of Cadetships to certain Students for the Study of Courses approved by the Minister of Agriculture, and for other purposes.
Appeal Costs Fund (Amendment) Act 1969	No. 7792	15 April 1969
An Act to amend the Appeal Costs Fund Act 1964. (Note: Appeal Costs Fund Act 1964 (No. 7117))
Listening Devices Act 1969 (repealed)	No. 7804	22 April 1969
An Act to regulate the Use of Listening Devices and for other purposes. (Repealed by Surveillance Devices Act 1999 (No. 21 of 1999)
Victorian Inland Meat Authority (Amendment) Act 1969 (repealed)	No. 7808	6 May 1969
An Act to amend the Victorian Inland Meat Authority Act 1958. (Note: Victorian Inland Meat Authority Act 1958 (No. 6411)) (Repealed by Victorian Inland Meat Authority Act 1974 (No. 8572)
Constitution Act Amendment (Electoral) Act 1969	No. 7809	6 May 1969
An Act to amend The Constitution Act Amendment Act 1958 (Note: Constitution Act Amendment Act 1958 (No. 6224)) and the Commonwealth Arrangements Act 1958 (Note: Commonwealth Arrangements Act 1958 (No. 6223)) and for other purposes.
	No. 7810	6 May 1969
An Act to apply out of the Consolidated Revenue the sum of One hundred and twenty-one million nine hundred and seventy-three thousand five hundred dollars to the service of the year One thousand nine hundred and sixty-nine and One thousand nine hundred and seventy.
St. Vincent's Private Hospital (Guarantees) Act 1969	No. 7815	13 May 1969
An Act to authorize the Treasurer of Victoria to guarantee the Repayment of certain Moneys proposed to be borrowed by the Trustees of the Sisters of Charity of Australia and for other purposes.
Wombat Bonuses Act 1969	No. 7824	13 May 1969
An Act to amend the Vermin and Noxious Weeds Act 1958 (Note: Vermin and Noxious Weeds Act 1958 (No. 6409)) with respect to Payment of Bonuses for Destruction of Wombats.
	No. 7834	20 May 1969
An Act to apply out of the Consolidated Revenue the sum of Seventeen million one hundred and sixty-three thousand and nineteen dollars to the service of the year One thousand nine hundred and sixty-eight and One thousand nine hundred and sixty-nine.
Apprenticeship (Commission) Act 1969	No. 7843	20 May 1969
An Act to amend the Apprenticeship Act 1958 (Note: Apprenticeship Act 1958 (No. 6199)) with respect to the Constitution of the Commission.
Imitation Milk Act 1969	No. 7845	20 May 1969
An Act to prohibit the Manufacture and Sale of Imitation Milk, and for other purposes.
Finance Brokers Act 1969	No. 7846	20 May 1969
An Act to make Provision with respect to the Registration of Finance Brokers, and for other purposes.
Groundwater Act 1969 (repealed)	No. 7849	20 May 1969
An Act to make Provision for the Conservation of Underground Water and for other purposes. (Repealed by Water Act 1989 (No. 80 of 1989))
	No. 7850	30 September 1969
An Act to apply out of the Consolidated Revenue the sum of One hundred and forty-three million one hundred and sixty-nine thousand four hundred dollars to the service of the year One thousand nine hundred and sixty-nine and One thousand nine hundred and seventy.
Aboriginal Affairs (Amendment) Act 1969	No. 7861	28 October 1969
An Act to amend the Aboriginal Affairs Act 1967. (Note: Aboriginal Affairs Act 1967 (No. 7574))
Acts Interpretation (Time) Act 1969	No. 7865	28 October 1969
An Act to amend the Acts Interpretation Act 1958 (Note: Acts Interpretation Act 1958 (No. 6189)) with respect to the Computation of Time.
Narree Worran Land Act 1969	No. 7866	28 October 1969
An Act to authorize the Granting of a Development Lease of certain Lands in the Parish of Narree Worran permanently reserved as a Site for Public Purposes and to revoke the Permanent Reservation so far as it relates to certain other Lands and for other purposes.
Apprenticeship (Regulations) Act 1969	No. 7869	5 November 1969
An Act to enable the Making of Regulations with respect to the Conditions of Employment of the President of the Apprenticeship Commission.
Melbourne University (Property) Act 1969	No. 7871	5 November 1969
An Act to amend the Melbourne University Act 1958 (Note: University Act 1958 (No. 6405)) with respect to the Acquisition of Land for University Purposes.
Administration and Probate (Foreign Grants) Act 1969	No. 7874	18 November 1969
An Act to make Provision for the Recognition of certain Foreign Grants of Probate and Administration, to amend Part III. of the Administration and Probate Act 1958 (Note: Administration and Probate Act 1958 (No. 6191)) and for other purposes.
Abolition of Obsolete Offences Act 1969	No. 7884	2 December 1969
An Act to amend the Crimes Act 1958, (Note: Crimes Act 1958 (No. 6231)) the Legal Profession Practice Act 1958, (Note: Legal Profession Practice Act 1958 (No. 6291)) and the Wrongs Act 1958 (Note: Wrongs Act 1958 (No. 6420)) for Abolishing certain Obsolete Criminal Offences and for Purposes connected therewith.
Constitution Act Amendment (Standing Appropriations) Act 1969	No. 7888	2 December 1969
An Act to amend Section 66 of The Constitution Act Amendment Act 1958.
Navigable Waters (Oil Pollution) (Amendment) Act 1969	No. 7890	2 December 1969
An Act to amend the Navigable Waters (Oil Pollution) Act 1960, (Note: Navigable Waters (Oil Pollution) Act 1960 (No. 6705)) and for other purposes.
North Melbourne Lands (Loans to Lessees) Act 1969	No. 7905	9 December 1969
An Act to amend the North Melbourne Lands Act 1966. (Note: North Melbourne Lands Act 1966 (No. 7446))
Water Supply Loan Application Act 1969 (repealed)	No. 7908	16 December 1969
An Act to sanction the Issue and Application of Loan Money for Works and other Purposes relating to Irrigation Water Supply Drainage Sewerage Flood Protection and River Improvement, and other purposes. (Repealed by Treasury Legislation (Repeal) Act 2005 (No. 73 of 2005))
Constitution Act Amendment (Conjoint Elections) Act 1969	No. 7912	16 December 1969
An Act to amend The Constitution Act Amendment Act 1958 with respect to the Holding and Conduct of Conjoint Elections.
Motor Car Act 1969	No. 7916	16 December 1969
An Act to amend the Motor Car Act 1958 (Note: Motor Car Act 1958 (No. 6325)) and for other purposes.
	No. 7927	16 December 1969
An Act to apply out of the Consolidated Revenue the sum of Three million six hundred and eighty-four thousand four hundred and twenty-five dollars to the service of the year One thousand nine hundred and sixty-eight and One thousand nine hundred and sixty-nine.
National Parks (Amendment) Act 1969	No. 7928	16 December 1969
An Act to include Additional Land in certain National Parks, to declare certain other Lands to be National Parks, to amend the National Parks Act 1958 (Note: National Parks Act 1958 (No. 6326)) and the National Parks (Amendment) Act 1965 (Note: National Parks (Amendment) Act 1965 (No. 7275)) and for other purposes.
	No. 7932	17 December 1969
An Act to apply a sum out of the Consolidated Revenue to the service of the year ending on the thirtieth day of June One thousand nine hundred and seventy and to appropriate the Supplies granted in this and the last preceding Session of Parliament.
Belmont Common Recreation Ground Lands Act 1969	No.	
Church of England in Australia (Mount Shadwell Land) Act 1969	No.	
Coal Mines (Accidents Relief) Act 1969	No.	
Coal Mines (Pensions Increase) Act 1969	No.	
Coal Mines (Pensions) Act 1969	No.	
Commercial Goods Vehicles (Tow Trucks) Act 1969	No.	
Country Fire Authority (Amendment) Act 1969	No.	
Country Roads (Amendment) Act 1969	No.	
Crown Proceedings (Forfeited Recognisances) Act 1969	No.	
Crown Reservations (Revocation and Excision) Act 1969	No.	
Discharged Servicemen's Preference (Amendment) Act 1969	No.	
Dried Fruits (Packing Houses) Act 1969	No.	
Drought Relief (Amendment) Act 1969	No.	
Education (Army Apprentices School) Act 1969	No.	
Education (Director-General) Act 1969	No.	
Educational Grants (Amendment) Act 1969	No.	
Evidence (Bankers' Books) Act 1969	No.	
Farm Produce Merchants and Commission Agents (Amendment) Act 1969	No.	
Fire Authorities (Borrowing Powers) Act 1969	No.	
Fire Brigades (Contributions) Act 1969	No.	
Firearms (Amendment) Act 1969	No.	
Footscray (Lower Yarra Crossing Access Road) Land Act 1969	No.	
Forests (Softwood Timber Agreement) Act 1969	No.	
Friendly Societies (Amendment) Act 1969	No.	
Gas Act 1969	No.	
Gas and Fuel Corporation (Borrowing) Act 1969	No.	
Gas and Fuel Corporation (Sale Undertaking) Act 1969	No.	
Geelong Waterworks and Sewerage (Amendment) Act 1969	No.	
Goods (Trade Descriptions) Act 1969	No.	
Health (Amendment) Act 1969	No.	
Health (Municipal Charges) Act 1969	No.	
Instruments (Bills of Exchange Amendment) Act 1969	No.	
Juries (Amendment) Act 1969	No.	
Justices (Amendment) Act 1969	No.	
Labour and Industry (Amendment) Act 1969	No.	
Labour and Industry (Further Amendment) Act 1969	No.	
Labour and Industry (Long Service Leave) Act 1969	No.	
Land Tax (Rates) Act 1969	No.	
Lands Compensation (Costs and Expenses) Act 1969	No.	
Latrobe Valley (Amendment) Act 1969	No.	
Latrobe Valley (Lands for Ambulance Services) Act 1969	No.	
Legal Aid Act 1969	No.	
Legal Profession Practice (Amendment) Act 1969	No.	
Legal Profession Practice Act 1969	No.	
Local Government (Rating Exemptions) Act 1969	No.	
Local Government Act 1969	No.	
Lotteries Gaming and Betting (Calcutta Sweepstakes) Act 1969	No.	
Maintenance (Amendment) Act 1969	No.	
Manango (O'Shannassy River Watershed) Lands Act 1969	No.	
Marine (Amendment) Act 1969	No.	
Marine Stores and Old Metals (Amendment) Act 1969	No.	
Marketing of Primary Products (Amendment) Act 1969	No.	
Medical (Pharmaceutical Chemists) Act 1969	No.	
Melbourne (St. Kilda-road Underpass) Lands Act 1969	No.	
Melbourne and Metropolitan Board of Works (Amendment) Act 1969	No.	
Melbourne Wholesale Fruit and Vegetable Market (Advisory Committee) Act 1969	No.	
Melbourne Wholesale Fruit and Vegetable Market (Amendment) Act 1969	No.	
Mental Health (Chairmanship) Act 1969	No.	
Metropolitan Fire Brigades (Amendment) Act 1969	No.	
Mildura Irrigation and Water Trusts Act 1969	No.	
Milk Board (Amendment) Act 1969	No.	
Mines (Abolition of Courts) Act 1969	No.	
Ministry of Transport (Director of Transport) Act 1969	No.	
Moorpanyal Lands Act 1969	No.	
Motor Car (Amendment) Act 1969	No.	
Motor Car (Traffic Offenders) Act 1969	No.	
Parliamentary Salaries and Superannuation (Administration) Act 1969	No.	
Portland Lands Exchange Act 1969	No.	
Preston School of Design and Free Library Land Act 1969	No.	
Probate Duty Act 1969	No.	
Protection of Animals (Penalties) Act 1969	No.	
Public Service (Amendment) Act 1969	No.	
Public Works Loan Application Act 1969	No.	
Racing (Amendment) Act 1969	No.	
Racing (Trotting Racing) Act 1969	No.	
Railway Loan Application Act 1969	No.	
Railways (Offences) Act 1969	No.	
Railways (Surplus Lands) Act 1969	No.	
Revenue Deficits Funding Act 1969	No.	
Revocation and Excision of Crown Reservations Act 1969	No.	
River Improvement (Amendment) Act 1969	No.	
Road Traffic (Amendment) Act 1969	No.	
Sale of Land (Amendment) Act 1969	No.	
Sewerage Districts (Amendment) Act 1969	No.	
South Melbourne (Roman Catholic Orphanage) Lands Act 1969	No.	
Stamps (Amendment) Act 1969	No.	
Stamps (Mortgages) Act 1969	No.	
State Electricity Commission (Borrowing and Investing Powers) Act 1969	No.	
State Forests Loan Application Act 1969	No.	
State Rivers and Water Supply Commission (Special Projects) Act 1969	No.	
State Savings Bank (Amendment) Act 1969	No.	
Strata Titles (Amendment) Act 1969	No.	
Summary Offences (Sunday Newspapers) Act 1969	No.	
Summary Offences Act 1969	No.	
Sunday Entertainment (Evidence) Act 1969	No.	
Superannuation (Amendment) Act 1969	No.	
Supreme Court (Correction of Sentences) Act 1969	No.	
Swan Hill Race-course and Golf-course Lands Act 1969	No.	
Teaching Service (Amendment) Act 1969	No.	
Theatres (Amendment) Act 1969	No.	
Theatres (Performance of Sacred Works) Act 1969	No.	
Tobacco Leaf Industry Stabilization (Tobacco Quotas) Act 1969	No.	
Tourist Act 1969	No.	
Town and Country Planning (Compensation) Act 1969	No.	
Town and Country Planning (Further Amendment) Act 1969	No.	
Town and Country Planning (Transitional Appeals) Act 1969	No.	
Transfer of Land (Subdivision of Allotments) Act 1969	No.	
Transport Regulation (Financial) Act 1969	No.	
Trustee (Amendment) Act 1969	No.	
Trustee (Authorized Investments) Act 1969	No.	
Trustee Companies (Burns Philp Trustee Company Limited) Act 1969	No.	
Water (Amendment) Act 1969	No.	
Weights and Measures (Amendment) Act 1969	No.	
Weights and Measures (Amendment) Act 1969	No.	
Weights and Measures (Fees) Act 1969	No.	
West Moorabool Water Board (Amendment) Act 1969	No.	
Wheat Industry Stabilization (Amendment) Act 1969	No.	
Wheat Marketing Act 1969	No.	

== Sources ==
- "1969 Victorian Historical Acts". AustLII.
