= List of acts of the Parliament of Victoria from 1931 =

This is a list of acts of the Parliament of Victoria, Australia for the year 1931.

== 1931 ==
Short title, or popular name	Citation	Royal assent
Long title
	No. 3951	2 July 1931
An Act to apply out of the Consolidated Revenue the sum of One million four hundred and eighty-one thousand eight hundred and eighty-four pounds to the service of the year One thousand nine hundred and thirty-one and One thousand nine hundred and thirty-two.
Debt Conversion Agreement Act 1931 (repealed)	No. 3953	29 July 1931
An Act to approve an Agreement between the Commonwealth of Australia of the First Part and the States of New South Wales, Victoria, Queensland, South Australia, Western Australia and Tasmania of the Second, Third, Fourth, Fifth, Sixth and Seventh Parts respectively relating to the Conversion of the Internal Public Debts of the Commonwealth and the States. (Repealed by Treasury Legislation (Repeal) Act 2005 (No. 73 of 2005))
	No. 3954	30 July 1931
An Act to apply out of the Consolidated Revenue the sum of Eight hundred and sixty-seven thousand three hundred and thirty-six pounds to the service of the year One thousand nine hundred and thirty and One thousand nine hundred and thirty-one.
	No. 3955	7 August 1931
An Act to apply out of the Consolidated Revenue the sum of One million one hundred and sixty-nine thousand six hundred and seventy-four pounds to the service of the year One thousand nine hundred and thirty-one and One thousand nine hundred and thirty-two.
Stamps (Unemployment Relief) Act 1931	No. 3958	26 August 1931
An Act to provide for the Temporary Continuation of the Stamps (Unemployment Relief) Acts.
	No. 3959	3 September 1931
An Act to apply out of the Consolidated Revenue the sum of One million and eighty-five thousand four hundred and fifty-one pounds to the service of the year One thousand nine hundred and thirty-one and One thousand nine hundred and thirty-two.
Financial Emergency Act 1931	No. 3961	24 September 1931
An Act to make necessary Provision for carrying out a Plan agreed on by the Commonwealth and the States for meeting the grave Financial Emergency existing in Australia, re-establishing Financial Stability, and restoring Industrial and General Prosperity.
Unemployed Occupiers and Farmers Relief Act 1931	No. 3962	24 September 1931
An Act to provide Temporary Relief to Unemployed Lessees Mortgagors and Purchasers under Contracts of Sale of Dwelling-houses and to Farmers in respect of Debts and for other purposes.
	No. 3964	1 October 1931
An Act to apply out of the Consolidated Revenue the sum of One million and nineteen thousand four hundred and fifty-eight pounds to the service of the year One thousand nine hundred and thirty-one and One thousand nine hundred and thirty-two.
Royal Agricultural Show-grounds Act 1931	No. 3965	8 October 1931
An Act to provide for the Use of certain Lands in the Parish of Doutta Galla forming Portion of the Royal Agricultural Show Grounds for Purposes of Recreation Entertainment or Amusement in addition to the Purposes provided for in certain Orders in Council and Crown Grants relating to the said Lands, the Application of the Net Profits of such Use of the said Lands, and the Validation of the Transfers of certain Lands previously forming Portions of the said Royal Agricultural Show Grounds.
Stamps (Unemployment Relief) Act 1931 (No. 2)	No. 3966	8 October 1931
An Act to amend the Stamps (Unemployment Relief) Acts and to provide for the Temporary Continuation thereof.
Camberwell Loans Act 1931	No. 3967	27 October 1931
An Act to authorize the City of Camberwell to expend the Balances of certain Moneys for purposes other than the purposes for which the said Moneys were borrowed by the said City.
Queen Victoria Memorial Hospital Land Act 1931	No. 3968	27 October 1931
An Act relating to the Revocation of the Reservation of certain Land in the City of Melbourne permanently reserved as a Site for the purposes of the Incorporated Institution called the Queen Victoria Memorial Hospital and the Revocation of the Crown Grant of the said Land and to provide for the Grant of the said Land and certain other Land in the said City to the said Institution.
Unemployed Occupiers and Farmers Relief (Amendment) Act 1931	No. 3971	4 November 1931
An Act to amend Section Twenty-one of the Unemployed Occupiers and Farmers Relief Act 1931. (Note: Unemployed Occupiers and Farmers Relief Act 1931 (No. 3962))
	No. 3972	4 November 1931
An Act to apply out of the Consolidated Revenue the sum of Nine hundred and thirty-six thousand three hundred and sixty-three pounds to the service of the year One thousand nine hundred and thirty-one and One thousand nine hundred and thirty-two.
Stamps (Unemployment Relief) Act 1931 (No. 3)	No. 3973	4 November 1931
An Act to amend the Stamps (Unemployment Relief) Acts and to provide for the Temporary Continuation thereof.
	No. 3977	2 December 1931
An Act to apply out of the Consolidated Revenue the sum of One million three hundred and one thousand five hundred and eighty-six pounds to the service of the year On e thousand nine hundred and thirty-one and One thousand nine hundred and thirty-two.
Motor Car Act 1931	No. 3981	4 December 1931
An Act relating to the Registration of Motor Cars.
Stamps (Unemployment Relief) Act 1931 (No. 4)	No. 3982	4 December 1931
An Act to amend and continue the Stamps (Unemployment Relief) Acts.
Mildura Vineyards Protection Act 1931 (repealed)	No. 3983	15 December 1931
An Act to repeal the Mildura Vineyards Protection Acts and for other purposes. (Repealed by Legislation Reform (Repeals No. 2) Act 2008 (No. 16 of 2008))
Local Government (Temporary Reduction of Interest) Act 1931	No. 3985	24 December 1931
An Act to reduce temporarily the Rate of Interest payable by certain Owners in accordance with Section Five hundred and eighty-two of the Local Government Act 1928. (Note: Local Government Act 1928 (19 Geo. V. No. 3720))
Vacuum Oil Company Proprietary Limited Act 1931 (repealed)	No. 3989	24 December 1931
An Act relating to the Vacuum Oil Company Proprietary Limited. (Repealed by Vacuum Oil Company Proprietary Limited Act 1931 (Repeal) Act 1934 (No. 4218))
Dried Fruits Act 1931 (repealed)	No. 3992	24 December 1931
An Act to amend Section Six of the Dried Fruits Act 1928 (Note: Dried Fruits Act 1928 (19 Geo. V. No. 3670)) and for other purposes. (Repealed by Dried Fruits Act 1938 (No. 4594))
Unemployment Relief Amendment Act 1931	No. 4000	30 December 1931
An Act to amend and continue the Unemployment Relief Acts and to continue the Stamps (Unemployment Relief) Acts and to make provision with respect to Collections for Unemployment.
Malvern Loans Act 1931	No. 4003	30 December 1931
An Act to authorize the City of Malvern to expend the Balances of certain Moneys for purposes other than the purposes for which the said Moneys were borrowed by the said City.
Debt Conversion Agreement Act 1931 (No. 2) (repealed)	No. 4009	30 December 1931
An Act to approve an Agreement between the Commonwealth of Australia of the First Part and the States of New South Wales. Victoria, Queensland, South Australia, Western Australia and Tasmania of the Second, Third, Fourth, Fifth, Sixth and Seventh Parts respectively relating to the Compulsory Conversion of the Internal Debts of the Commonwealth and the States in certain cases and to refer to the Parliament of the Commonwealth a certain Matter in connexion with the Compulsory Conversion of such Debts, and for other purposes. (Repealed by Treasury Legislation (Repeal) Act 2005 (No. 73 of 2005))
Stamps Act 1931	No. 4014	30 December 1931
An Act to amend the Law relating to Stamps and Stamp Duties.
	No. 4016	30 December 1931
An Act to apply out of the Consolidated Revenue the sum of Three million nine hundred and twenty-one thousand nine hundred and twenty-eight pounds to the service of the year One thousand nine hundred and thirty-one and One thousand nine hundred and thirty-two.
Administration and Probate Duties Act 1931	No. 4017	30 December 1931
An Act to continue Part III. of the Finance Act 1930 (Note: Finance Act 1930 (No. 3889)) and to increase the Duties payable under Part VI. of the Administration and Probate Act 1928 (Note: Administration and Probate Act 1928 (19 Geo. V. No. 3632)) and under the Administration and Probate Duties Act 1929 (Note: Administration and Probate Duties Act 1929 (20 Geo. V. No. 3849)) and under the said Part III.
Caulfield Loans Act 1931	No.	
Cemeteries Act 1931	No.	
Closer Settlement (Financial) Act 1931	No.	
Companies Act 1931	No.	
Cultivation Advances Act 1931	No.	
Dairy Produce Act 1931	No.	
Electricity Supply Loans Application Act 1931	No.	
Federal Aid Roads Act 1931	No.	
Financial Emergency (Amendment) Act 1931	No.	
Financial Emergency (Amendment) Act 1931 (No. 2)	No.	
Fisheries Act 1931	No.	
Hawkers and Pedlers Act 1931	No.	
Health Act 1931	No.	
Income Tax Act 1931	No.	
Income Tax Acts Amendment Act 1931	No.	
Indeterminate Sentences Act 1931	No.	
Instruments Act 1931	No.	
Land Tax Act 1931	No.	
Landlord and Tenant (Rent Reduction) Act 1931	No.	
Licensing (Fees) Act 1931	No.	
Licensing (Half-yearly Payments) Act 1931	No.	
Melbourne and Metropolitan Tramways Board Act 1931	No.	
Mildura Irrigation and Water Trusts Act 1931	No.	
Northcote Loan Act 1931	No.	
Nurses Act 1931	No.	
Police Offences (Consorting) Act 1931	No.	
Police Offences (Sports Grounds) Act 1931	No.	
Police Offences (Trotting Races) Act 1931	No.	
Preston Loan Act 1931	No.	
Public Works Loan Application Act 1931	No.	
Railway Loan Application Act 1931	No.	
Sewerage Districts (Temporary Reduction of Interest) Act 1931	No.	
South Melbourne Loan Act 1931	No.	
Treasury Bonds Act 1931	No.	
Treasury Overdrafts Act 1931	No.	
Trustee Act 1931	No.	
Wareek Land Act 1931	No.	
Water Supply Loans Application Act 1931	No.	
Workers' Compensation (Transfer of Funds) Act 1931	No.	

== Sources ==
- "1931 Victorian Historical Acts". AustLII.
