= List of acts of the Parliament of Victoria from 2018 =

This is a list of acts of the Parliament of Victoria, Australia for the year 2018.

== 2018 ==
Short title, or popular name	Citation	Royal assent
Long title
Compensation Legislation Amendment Act 2018	No. 1 of 2018	
Firearms Amendment Act 2018	No. 2 of 2018	13 February 2018
An Act to amend the Firearms Act 1996 (Note: Firearms Act 1996 (No. 66 of 1996)) and to make consequential and related amendments to the Control of Weapons Act 1990, (Note: Control of Weapons Act 1990 (No. 24 of 1990)) the Criminal Organisations Control Act 2012 (Note: Criminal Organisations Control Act 2012 (No. 80 of 2012)) and the Fortification Removal Act 2013 (Note: Fortification Removal Act 2013 (No. 48 of 2013)) and for other purposes.
Bail Amendment (Stage Two) Act 2018	No. 3 of 2018	
Health and Child Wellbeing Legislation Amendment Act 2018	No. 4 of 2018	
Justice Legislation Amendment (Victims) Act 2018	No. 5 of 2018	
Oaths and Affirmations Act 2018	No. 6 of 2018	
Planning and Environment Amendment (Public Land Contributions) Act 2018	No. 7 of 2018	
Road Safety Amendment (Automated Vehicles) Act 2018	No. 8 of 2018	
Gambling Legislation Amendment Act 2018	No. 9 of 2018	
Racing Amendment (Modernisation) Act 2018	No. 10 of 2018	
Children Legislation Amendment (Information Sharing) Act 2018	No. 11 of 2018	
Long Service Leave Act 2018	No. 12 of 2018	
Major Events Legislation Amendment (Ticket Scalping and Other Matters) Act 2018	No. 13 of 2018	
Service Victoria Act 2018	No. 14 of 2018	
Justice Legislation Amendment (Access to Justice) Act 2018	No. 15 of 2018	
Offshore Petroleum and Greenhouse Gas Storage Amendment Act 2018	No. 16 of 2018	
Planning and Environment Amendment (Distinctive Areas and Landscapes) Act 2018	No. 17 of 2018	
Legal Identity of Defendants (Organisational Child Abuse) Act 2018	No. 18 of 2018	
Parks Victoria Act 2018	No. 19 of 2018	
Liquor and Gambling Legislation Amendment Act 2018	No. 20 of 2018	
National Redress Scheme for Institutional Child Sexual Abuse (Commonwealth Powers) Act 2018	No. 21 of 2018	
State Taxation Acts Amendment Act 2018	No. 22 of 2018	
Appropriation (Parliament 2018-2019) Act 2018	No. 23 of 2018	
Appropriation (2018-2019) Act 2018	No. 24 of 2018	
Labour Hire Licensing Act 2018	No. 25 of 2018	26 June 2018
An Act to provide for the regulation and licensing of providers of labour hire services, to establish the Labour Hire Licensing Authority and the office of Labour Hire Licensing Commissioner, to amend the Public Administration Act 2004 (Note: Public Administration Act 2004 (No. 108 of 2004)) and for other purposes.
Marine and Coastal Act 2018	No. 26 of 2018	26 June 2018
An Act to provide for the integrated and co-ordinated planning and management of the marine and coastal environment of Victoria, to repeal and partially re-enact the Coastal Management Act 1995 (Note: Coastal Management Act 1995 (No. 8 of 1995)) and to amend various other Acts and for other purposes.
Serious Offenders Act 2018	No. 27 of 2018	
Advancing the Treaty Process with Aboriginal Victorians Act 2018	No. 28 of 2018	3 July 2018
An Act to advance the treaty process between Aboriginal Victorians and the State by providing for the recognition of the Aboriginal Representative Body, enshrining the guiding principles for the treaty process and requiring the Aboriginal Representative Body and the State to work together to establish elements necessary to support future treaty negotiations and for other purposes.
Corrections Amendment (Parole) Act 2018	No. 29 of 2018	
Electoral Legislation Amendment Act 2018	No. 30 of 2018	
Education Legislation Amendment (Victorian Institute of Teaching, TAFE and Other Matters) Act 2018	No. 31 of 2018	
Justice Legislation Amendment (Terrorism) Act 2018	No. 32 of 2018	
Justice Legislation Amendment (Family Violence Protection and Other Matters) Act 2018	No. 33 of 2018	
Owners Corporations Amendment (Short-stay Accommodation) Act 2018	No. 34 of 2018	
Victorian Industry Participation Policy (Local Jobs First) Amendment Act 2018	No. 35 of 2018	
Emergency Management Legislation Amendment Act 2018	No. 36 of 2018	
Racing Amendment (Integrity and Disciplinary Structures) Act 2018	No. 37 of 2018	
Disability Service Safeguards Act 2018	No. 38 of 2018	28 August 2018
An Act to provide a regulatory scheme for disability workers and disability students, to amend the Residential Tenancies Act 1997 (Note: Residential Tenancies Act 1997 (No. 109 of 1997)) to provide for the rights and duties of SDA residents and SDA providers consistent with the National Disability Insurance Scheme, to make consequential amendments to the Disability Act 2006, (Note: Disability Act 2006 (No. 23 of 2006)) the Health Complaints Act 2016, (Note: Health Complaints Act 2016 (No. 22 of 2016)) the Land Tax Act 2005, (Note: Land Tax Act 2005 (No. 88 of 2005)) the Ombudsman Act 1973, (Note: Ombudsman Act 1973 (No. 8414)) the Public Administration Act 2004, the Supported Residential Services (Private Proprietors) Act 2010 (Note: Supported Residential Services (Private Proprietors) Act 2010 (No. 49 of 2010)) and the Victorian Civil and Administrative Tribunal Act 1998 (Note: Victorian Civil and Administrative Tribunal Act 1998 (No. 53 of 1998)) and for other purposes.
Environment Protection Amendment Act 2018	No. 39 of 2018	
Residential Tenancies Amendment (Long-term Tenancy Agreements) Act 2018	No. 40 of 2018	
Prevention of Family Violence Act 2018	No. 41 of 2018	
Victims and Other Legislation Amendment Act 2018	No. 42 of 2018	
Electricity Safety Amendment (Electrical Equipment Safety Scheme) Act 2018	No. 43 of 2018	
Long Service Benefits Portability Act 2018	No. 44 of 2018	
Residential Tenancies Amendment Act 2018	No. 45 of 2018	18 September 2018
An Act to amend the Residential Tenancies Act 1997, to make consequential amendments to that Act and other Acts and for other purposes.
Building Amendment (Registration of Building Trades and Other Matters) Act 2018	No. 46 of 2018	
Gambling Regulation Amendment (Wagering and Betting) Act 2018	No. 47 of 2018	
Justice Legislation Miscellaneous Amendment Act 2018	No. 48 of 2018	
Treasury and Finance Legislation Amendment Act 2018	No. 49 of 2018	

== Sources ==
- "Acts as made: 2018". Victoria Legislation.
