= List of acts of the Parliament of Victoria from 1954 =

This is a list of acts of the Parliament of Victoria, Australia for the year 1954.

== 1954 ==
Short title, or popular name	Citation	Royal assent
Long title
Town and Country Planning Act 1954	No. 5778	11 May 1954
An Act to amend the Town and Country Planning Acts, and for other purposes.
	No. 5785	11 May 1954
An Act to apply out of the Consolidated Revenue the sum of Twenty-one million two hundred and thirteen thousand one hundred and seventy-seven pounds to the service of the year One thousand nine hundred and fifty-four and One thousand nine hundred and fifty-five.
	No. 5786	29 September 1954
An Act to apply out of the Consolidated Revenue the sum of Thirteen million nine hundred and one thousand four hundred and seventy-five pounds to the service of the year One thousand nine hundred and fifty-four and One thousand nine hundred and fifty-five.
	No. 5787	29 September 1954
An Act to apply out of the Consolidated Revenue the sum of Two million six hundred and ninety-six thousand five hundred and four pounds to the service of the year One thousand nine hundred and fifty-three and One thousand nine hundred and fifty-four.
Auditor-General's Salary Act 1954	No. 5788	19 October 1954
An Act relating to the Salary of the Auditor-General.
Apprenticeship (Amendment) Act 1954	No. 5796	3 November 1954
An Act to amend Sections Twenty-six and Thirty-eight of the Apprenticeship Act 1928. (Note: Apprenticeship Act 1928 (19 Geo. V. No. 3636))
Swan Hill Lands Exchange Act 1954 (repealed)	No. 5810	23 November 1954
An Act relating to the Exchange of Lands at Swan Hill. (Repealed by Statute Law Revision Act 1984 (No. 10087))
Miners' Phthisis (Treasury Allowances) (Amendment) Act 1954 (repealed)	No. 5811	23 November 1954
An Act to further amend the Miners' Phthisis (Treasury Allowances) Act 1938. (Note: Miners' Phthisis (Treasury Allowances) Act 1938 (No. 4567)) (Repealed by Statute Law Revision Act 1995 (No. 11 of 1995))
	No. 5818	1 December 1954
An Act to apply out of the Consolidated Revenue the sum of Seven million seven hundred and ninety-five thousand three hundred and forty-five pounds to the service of the year One thousand nine hundred and fifty-four and One thousand nine hundred and fifty-five.
Mildura College Lands (Amendment) Act 1954 (repealed)	No. 5830	14 December 1954
An Act to amend the Mildura College Lands Act 1916. (Note: Mildura College Lands Act 1916 (7 Geo. V. No. 2842)) (Repealed by Statute Law Revision Act 1995 (No. 11 of 1995))
Statutes Amendment Act 1954 (repealed)	No. 5846	14 December 1954
An Act to amend the Acts Interpretation Acts, the Administration and Probate Acts, the Business Names Act 1928, (Note: Business Names Act 1928 (19 Geo. V. No. 3648)) the Justices Acts, the Landlord and Tenant Acts, the Maintenance Acts, the Marriage Acts, the Poor Persons Legal Assistance Act 1928, (Note: Poor Persons Legal Assistance Act 1928 (19 Geo. V. No. 3751)) the Registration of Births Deaths and Marriages Acts, the Supreme Court Acts, the Wills Acts, the Dried Fruits Act 1938, (Note: Dried Fruits Act 1938 (No. 4594)) the Companies Acts and the Marketing of Primary Products Acts. (Repealed by Statute Law Revision Act 1995 (No. 11 of 1995))
Landlord and Tenant Act 1954	No. 5847	14 December 1954
An Act to make further Amendments in the Law relating to Landlord and Tenant.
Public Works Loan Application Act 1954 (repealed)	No. 5850	14 December 1954
An Act to sanction the Issue and Application of Loan Money for Public Works and other Purposes. (Repealed by Treasury Legislation (Repeal) Act 2005 (No. 73 of 2005))
Adoption of Children (Amendment) Act 1954	No. 5851	14 December 1954
An Act to amend the Adoption of Children Acts.
	No. 5853	14 December 1954
An Act to apply a sum out of the Consolidated Revenue to the service of the year ending on the thirtieth day of June One thousand nine hundred and fifty-five and to appropriate the Supplies granted in this Session of Parliament.
Bellarine Water Supply Act 1954	No.	
Chandler Highway and Bridge Act 1954	No.	
Children's Welfare Act 1954	No.	
Co-operative Housing Societies (Guarantees) Act 1954	No.	
Coal Mine Workers Pensions (Amendment) Act 1954	No.	
Corneal Grafting Act 1954	No.	
Country Roads (Amendment) Act 1954	No.	
Country Roads and Level Crossings Funds Act 1954	No.	
County Court (Judges) Act 1954	No.	
Crimes Act 1954	No.	
Dog Races Act 1954	No.	
Entertainments Tax (Amendment) Act 1954	No.	
Finance (Racing) Act 1954	No.	
Fire Brigades (Amendment) Act 1954	No.	
Forests (Amendment) Act 1954	No.	
Friendly Societies (Amendment) Act 1954	No.	
Gas and Fuel Corporation (Kyneton Undertaking) Act 1954	No.	
Gas and Fuel Corporation (Mornington Undertaking) Act 1954	No.	
Gas Regulation (Amendment) Act 1954	No.	
Geelong and District Cultural Institute Act 1954	No.	
Goods (Amendment) Act 1954	No.	
Health (Amendment) Act 1954	No.	
Health (Infectious Diseases) Act 1954	No.	
Hide and Leather Industries (Suspension) Act 1954	No.	
Housing Act 1954	No.	
Infectious Diseases Hospitals Act 1954	No.	
Judges (Powers) Act 1954	No.	
Judges Salaries Act 1954	No.	
Justices (Amendment) Act 1954	No.	
Land Tax Act 1954	No.	
Local Government (Amendment) Act 1954	No.	
Local Government (City of Sunshine) Act 1954	No.	
Melbourne and Metropolitan Board of Works (Amendment) Act 1954	No.	
Melbourne and Metropolitan Tramways (Board) Act 1954	No.	
Melbourne Cricket Ground (Guarantee) Act 1954	No.	
Mental Hygiene (Maintenance) Act 1954	No.	
Midwives (Amendment) Act 1954	No.	
Napier-street Bridge Act 1954	No.	
Parking of Vehicles (Amendment) Act 1954	No.	
Parliamentary Contributory Retirement Fund Act 1954	No.	
Parliamentary Salaries and Allowances Act 1954	No.	
Police Offences (Female Offenders) Act 1954	No.	
Police Offences (Obscene Publications) Act 1954	No.	
Police Offences (Sports Grounds) Act 1954	No.	
Police Offences (Unlawful Games) Act 1954	No.	
Portland Harbor Trust (Amendment) Act 1954	No.	
Public Officers Salaries Act 1954	No.	
Public Service (Amendment) Act 1954	No.	
Railway Loan Application Act 1954	No.	
Railways (Commissioners' Salaries) Act 1954	No.	
River Murray Waters Act 1954	No.	
Soldier Settlement (Financial) Act 1954	No.	
State Electricity Commission (Borrowing) Act 1954	No.	
State Forests Loan Application Act 1954	No.	
State Savings Bank (Deposits) Act 1954	No.	
Superannuation (Female Officers) Act 1954	No.	
Surplus Revenue Act 1954	No.	
Totalizator (Amendment) Act 1954	No.	
Town and Country Planning (Metropolitan Area) Act 1954	No.	
Transfer of Land Act 1954	No.	
Transport Regulation (Amendment) Act 1954	No.	
Vermin and Noxious Weeds (Amendment) Act 1954	No.	
Water (Connexions to Mains) Act 1954	No.	
Water Act 1954	No.	
Water Supply Loan Application Act 1954	No.	
Wheat Industry Stabilization Act 1954	No.	

== Sources ==
- "1954 Victorian Historical Acts". AustLII.
