= List of acts of the Parliament of Victoria from 1911 =

This is a list of acts of the Parliament of Victoria, Australia for the year 1911.

== 1911 ==
| Short title, or popular name | Citation | Royal assent |
Long title
| Railway Loan Application Act 1910 (Note: Although the short title of this act ends "... Act 1910", it was passed in the year 1911.) | 1 Geo. V. No. 2285 | 4 January 1911 |
An Act to sanction the issue and application of certain Sums of Money available under Loan Acts for Railways.
| Victorian Loan Act 1910 | 1 Geo. V. No. 2286 | 4 January 1911 |
An Act to authorize the raising of Money for Railways Public Works and other purposes.
| Duties Collection Act 1910 (repealed) | 1 Geo. V. No. 2287 | 4 January 1911 |
An Act to amend the Law relating to the Assessment Collection and Payment of Duties on the Estates of Deceased Persons, and of certain Duties under the Stamps Acts. (Repealed by Administration and Probate Act 1915 (6 Geo. V. No. 2611))
| Electoral Act 1910 (repealed) | 1 Geo. V. No. 2288 | 4 January 1911 |
An Act to amend the Law relating to Parliamentary Elections and for other purposes. (Repealed by Constitution Act Amendment Act 1915 (6 Geo. V. No. 2632))
| Water Supply Loans Application Act 1910 | 1 Geo. V. No. 2289 | 4 January 1911 |
An Act to sanction the issue and application of certain Sums of Money available under Loan Acts for Water Supply in Country Districts and for other purposes.
| Kow Plains to Murrayville Railway Construction Act 1910 | 1 Geo. V. No. 2290 | 4 January 1911 |
An Act to authorize the Construction by the State of a Line of Railway from Kow Plains to Murrayville.
| Factories and Shops Act 1910 (repealed) | 1 Geo. V. No. 2291 | 4 January 1911 |
An Act to further amend the Factories and Shops Acts with regard to Apprentices and Improvers. (Repealed by Factories and Shops Act 1912 (3 Geo. V. No. 2386))
| Gold Buyers Act 1910 (repealed) | 1 Geo. V. No. 2292 | 4 January 1911 |
An Act to amend the Gold Buyers Act 1907 (Note: Gold Buyers Act 1907 (7 Edw. VII. No. 2138)) and for other purposes. (Repealed by Gold Buyers Act 1915 (6 Geo. V. No. 2662))
| Companies Act 1910 (repealed) | 1 Geo. V. No. 2293 | 4 January 1911 |
An Act to consolidate and amend the Law relating to Companies and for other purposes. (Repealed by Companies Act 1915 (6 Geo. V. No. 2631))
| Prahran and Malvern Tramways Trust Act 1910 | 1 Geo. V. No. 2294 | 4 January 1911 |
An Act to consolidate and amend the Prahran and Malvern Tramways Trust Acts and for other purposes.
| Local Government Act 1910 (repealed) | 1 Geo. V. No. 2295 | 4 January 1911 |
An Act to extend the powers of Municipalities for making by-laws and to amend section Three hundred and forty-seven of the Local Government Act 1903. (Note: Local Government Act 1903 (3 Edw. VII. No. 1893)) (Repealed by Local Government Act 1915 (6 Geo. V. No. 2686))
| Footscray Municipal Loan Act 1910 | 1 Geo. V. No. 2296 | 4 January 1911 |
An Act to enable the Footscray City Council to carry out certain Works with the surplus Moneys in hand from the No. 4 Loan.
| Special Funds Act 1910 (repealed) | 1 Geo. V. No. 2297 | 4 January 1911 |
An Act to provide for the transfer out of the Assurance Fund under the Transfer of Land Act 1890 (Note: Transfer of Land Act 1890 (54 Vict. No. 1149)) of certain sums and for the establishment in the Treasury of certain Trust Funds and for other purposes. (Repealed by Public Account (Trust Funds) Act 1982 (No. 9861))
| Hawthorn Tramways Act 1910 | 1 Geo. V. No. 2298 | 4 January 1911 |
An Act to extend the provisions of the Tramways Act 1890 (Note: Tramways Act 1890 (54 Vict. No. 1148)) to the Municipality of Hawthorn and for other purposes.
| Kew Tramways Act 1910 | 1 Geo. V. No. 2299 | 4 January 1911 |
An Act to extend the provisions of the Tramways Act 1890 to the Municipality of Kew and for other purposes.
| Wonthaggi Borough Act 1910 | 1 Geo. V. No. 2300 | 4 January 1911 |
An Act to provide for the constitution under the Local Government Acts of the Borough of Wonthaggi and for other purposes.
| Education Act 1910 (repealed) | 1 Geo. V. No. 2301 | 4 January 1911 |
An Act to further amend the Law relating to Education and to Officers and Teachers of the Education Department. (Repealed by Education Act 1915 (6 Geo. V. No. 2644))
| Coleraine Land Act 1910 (repealed) | 1 Geo. V. No. 2302 | 4 January 1911 |
An Act to provide for the Sale of certain Land set apart for Show Yards at Coleraine and for other purposes. (Repealed by Statute Law Revision Act 1984 (No. 10087))
| Yarrawonga Land Act 1910 (repealed) | 1 Geo. V. No. 2303 | 4 January 1911 |
An Act to provide for the sale of certain Land set apart as a site for a Mechanics' Institute and Free Library at Yarrawonga and for other purposes. (Repealed by Statute Law Revision Act 1984 (No. 10087))
| Kyneton Temperence Hall Act 1910 | 1 Geo. V. No. 2304 | 4 January 1911 |
An Act to provide for the sale of certain Land set a part as a site for a Temperance Hall at Kyneton and other purposes.
| Factories and Shops Act 1910 (No. 2) (repealed) | 1 Geo. V. No. 2305 | 4 January 1911 |
An Act to further amend the Factories and Shops Acts. (Repealed by Factories and Shops Act 1912 (3 Geo. V. No. 2386))
| Crimes Act 1910 (repealed) | 1 Geo. V. No. 2306 | 4 January 1911 |
An Act to further amend the law relating to Crimes and Offences. (Repealed by Crimes Act 1915 (6 Geo. V. No. 2637))
| Public Works Loan Application Act 1910 | 1 Geo. V. No. 2307 | 4 January 1911 |
An Act to sanction the issue and application of certain Sums of Money available under Loan Acts for Public Works and other purposes.
| Victorian Government Special Inscribed Stock Act 1910 (repealed) | 1 Geo. V. No. 2308 | 4 January 1911 |
An Act to provide for the erection of a Special Stock to be called "Victorian Government Special Inscribed Stock" for sale to Friendly Societies only and for other purposes. (Repealed by Treasury Legislation (Repeal) Act 2005 (No. 73 of 2005))
| Closer Settlement Act 1910 | 1 Geo. V. No. 2309 | 4 January 1911 |
An Act to amend the Closer Settlement Act 1909 (No. 2). (Note: Closer Settlement Act 1909 (No. 2) (9 Edw. VII. No. 2229))
| Railways Act 1910 (repealed) | 1 Geo. V. No. 2310 | 4 January 1911 |
An Act to further amend the Law relating to the Victorian Railways. (Repealed by Railway Lands Acquisition Act 1915 (6 Geo. V. No. 2715))
| | 2 Geo. V. No. 2311 | 12 July 1911 |
An Act to apply out of the Consolidated Revenue the sum of One million eight hundred and eighty-five thousand six hundred and fourteen pounds to the service of the year One thousand nine hundred and eleven and One thousand nine hundred and twelve.
| Healesville Fire Brigade Land Act 1911 (repealed) | 2 Geo. V. No. 2312 | 4 August 1911 |
An Act to provide for the granting to the Country Fire Brigades Board of certain Land set out as a road in the Township of Healesville. (Repealed by Statute Law Revision Act 1984 (No. 10087))
| Beaufort Fire Brigade Land Act (repealed) | 2 Geo. V. No. 2313 | 4 August 1911 |
An Act to revoke the Proclamation as a Main Road of certain Land in the Town of Beaufort and to provide for the granting of such Land to the Country Fire Brigades Board. (Repealed by Statute Law Revision Act 1984 (No. 10087))
| Cocoroc Land Sale Act 1911 | 2 Geo. V. No. 2314 | 11 August 1911 |
An Act to revoke the permanent reservation of certain Land in the Parish of Cocoroc and for other purposes.
| | 2 Geo. V. No. 2315 | 11 August 1911 |
An Act to apply out of the Consolidated Revenue the sum of Four hundred and seventy-nine thousand eight hundred and forty-six pounds to the service of the year One thousand nine hundred and ten and One thousand nine hundred and eleven.
| Victorian Sanatoria for Consumptives Act 1911 | 2 Geo. V. No. 2316 | 4 September 1911 |
An Act relating to the Philanthropic Institution known as the Victorian Sanatoria for Consumptives.
| Friendly Societies Act 1911 (repealed) | 2 Geo. V. No. 2317 | 4 September 1911 |
An Act to further amend the Friendly Societies Act 1907. (Note: Friendly Societies Act 1907 (7 Edw. VII. No. 2107)) (Repealed by Friendly Societies Act 1915 (6 Geo. V. No. 2656))
| Mining Development Act 1911 (repealed) | 2 Geo. V. No. 2318 | 22 September 1911 |
An Act to amend the Mining Development Act 1908. (Note: Mining Development Act 1908 (8 Edw. VII. No. 2145)) (Repealed by Mining Development Act 1915 (6 Geo. V. No. 2699))
| Prince of Wales' Birthday Holiday Abolition Act 1911 (repealed) | 2 Geo. V. No. 2319 | 22 September 1911 |
An Act relating to a certain Public and Bank Holiday. (Repealed by Public Service Act 1915 (6 Geo. V. No. 2713))
| | 2 Geo. V. No. 2320 | 27 September 1911 |
An Act to apply out of the Consolidated Revenue the sum of One million and ninety-two thousand one hundred and ninety-four pounds to the service of the year One thousand nine hundred and eleven and One thousand nine hundred and twelve.
| Preferential Voting Act 1911 (repealed) | 2 Geo. V. No. 2321 | 30 September 1911 |
An Act to provide for Compulsory Preferential Voting at Elections for the Legislative Assembly. (Repealed by Constitution Act Amendment Act 1915 (6 Geo. V. No. 2632))
| Geelong Waterworks and Sewerage Act 1911 (repealed) | 2 Geo. V. No. 2322 | 6 October 1911 |
An Act to further amend the Geelong Municipal Waterworks Act 1907. (Note: Geelong Municipal Waterworks Act 1907 (7 Edw. VII. No. 2109)) (Repealed by Geelong Waterworks and Sewerage Act 1915 (6 Geo. V. No. 2661))
| Victorian Loan Act 1911 | 2 Geo. V. No. 2323 | 12 October 1911 |
An Act to authorize the raising of Money for Railways Public Works and other purposes.
| Administration and Probate Duties Act 1911 (repealed) | 2 Geo. V. No. 2324 | 13 October 1911 |
An Act relating to Duties payable under the Administration and Probate Acts. (Repealed by Administration and Probate Act 1915 (6 Geo. V. No. 2611))
| Income Tax Act 1911 (repealed) | 2 Geo. V. No. 2325 | 13 October 1911 |
An Act to declare the Rates of Income Tax for the Year ending on the thirty-first day of December One thousand nine hundred and twelve. (Repealed by Income Tax Act 1915 (6 Geo. V. No. 2668))
| Water Supply Loans Application Act 1911 | 2 Geo. V. No. 2326 | 13 October 1911 |
An Act to sanction the issue and application of certain Sums of Money available under Loan Acts for Irrigation Works and Water Supply Works in Country Districts and for Public Works and other purposes.
| Land Tax Act 1911 (repealed) | 2 Geo. V. No. 2327 | 20 October 1914 |
An Act to declare the Rate of Land Tax for the Year ending the thirty-first day of December One thousand nine hundred and twelve and for other purposes. (Repealed by Land Tax Act 1915 (6 Geo. V. No. 2680))
| Matches Act 1911 (repealed) | 2 Geo. V. No. 2328 | 20 October 1914 |
An Act to authorize the Prohibition of the Use or Sale of certain kinds of Matches in specified localities during certain months in the year. (Repealed by Police Offences Act 1915 (6 Geo. V. No. 2708))
| Railway Service Act 1911 (repealed) | 2 Geo. V. No. 2329 | 20 October 1914 |
An Act relating to the pension and compensation rights of certain officers and employés in the Railway Service and the reinstatement of certain persons in the Railway Service and for other purposes. (Repealed by Railway Lands Acquisition Act 1915 (6 Geo. V. No. 2715))
| Teachers Act 1911 (repealed) | 2 Geo. V. No. 2330 | 20 October 1914 |
An Act relating to State School Teachers. (Repealed by Public Service Act 1915 (6 Geo. V. No. 2713))
| Victorian Manganese Mines Iron and Steel Company's Railway Act 1911 | 2 Geo. V. No. 2331 | 20 October 1914 |
An Act to authorize the Construction and Maintenance by The Victorian Manganese Mines Iron and Steel Company No Liability of a Railway from Lakes Entrance in the Parish of Colquhoun County of Tambo to certain land in the Parishes of Nowa Nowa and Buchan held under mineral leases by the said Company and for other purposes.
| Land Act 1911 (repealed) | 2 Geo. V. No. 2332 | 24 October 1914 |
An Act to further amend the Land Acts and for other purposes. (Repealed by Land Act 1915 (6 Geo. V. No. 2676))
| Flemington-road Tramway Act 1911 | 2 Geo. V. No. 2333 | 24 October 1914 |
An Act to provide for the construction of a Branch Tramway for about four hundred feet near Flemington Bridge in the City of Melbourne.
| Municipal Endowment Act 1911 | 2 Geo. V. No. 2334 | 24 October 1914 |
An Act relating to Municipal Endowment.
| Municipalities Coronation Celebrations Act 1911 | 2 Geo. V. No. 2335 | 24 October 1914 |
An Act to authorize and validate certain Expenditure by Councils of Municipalities in connexion with the cost of celebrating the Coronation of His Majesty King George the Fifth.
| Ararat Land Purchase Act 1911 | 2 Geo. V. No. 2336 | 24 October 1911 |
An Act to provide for the Sale of certain Lands to the Shire of Ararat by certain Councillors of the said Shire.
| Saint Kilda Tramway Act 1911 | 2 Geo. V. No. 2337 | 24 October 1911 |
An Act to further extend the provisions of the Tramways Act 1890 to the Municipality of Saint Kilda within certain limits and for other purposes.
| Prahran and Malvern Tramways Trust Act 1911 | 2 Geo. V. No. 2338 | 24 October 1911 |
An Act to amend the Prahran and Malvern Tramways Trust Act 1910 (Note: Prahran and Malvern Tramways Trust Act 1910 (1 Geo. V. No. 2294)) and for other purposes.
| Yarram Lands Act 1911 (repealed) | 2 Geo. V. No. 2339 | 24 October 1911 |
An Act to enable certain Lands in the Parish of Yarram Yarram to be vested in the President Councillors and Ratepayers of the Shire of Alberton for pleasure grounds or a place of public resort or recreation and to provide for other purposes. (Repealed by Statute Law Revision Act 1984 (No. 10087))
| Walpeup Shire Act 1911 | 2 Geo. V. No. 2340 | 24 October 1911 |
An Act to provide for the constitution under the Local Government Acts of the Shire of Walpeup and for other purposes.
| Shearers' Hut Accommodation Act 1911 (repealed) | 2 Geo. V. No. 2341 | 24 October 1911 |
An Act to insure the better provision of Hut Accommodation for Shearers and others. (Repealed by Shearers' Hut Accommodation Act 1915 (6 Geo. V. No. 2726))
| Administration and Probate Act 1911 (repealed) | 2 Geo. V. No. 2342 | 24 October 1911 |
An Act to further amend the Administration and Probate Act 1890. (Note: Administration and Probate Act 1890 (54 Vict. No. 1060)) (Repealed by Administration and Probate Act 1915 (6 Geo. V. No. 2611))
| Coroners Act 1911 (repealed) | 2 Geo. V. No. 2343 | 24 October 1911 |
An Act to consolidate and amend the Law relating to Coroners. (Repealed by Coroners Act 1915 (6 Geo. V. No. 2634))
| Methodist Church Act 1911 | 2 Geo. V. No. 2344 | 24 October 1911 |
An Act to sanction the Constitution of the New Zealand Annual Conference of the Methodist Church of Australasia as an Independent Conference and for other purposes.
| Flood Protection Act 1911 (repealed) | 2 Geo. V. No. 2345 | 24 October 1911 |
An Act relating to the Protection of Land from Damage by Flood. (Repealed by Water Act 1915 (6 Geo. V. No. 2747))
| Railway Loan Application Act 1911 | 2 Geo. V. No. 2346 | 24 October 1911 |
An Act to sanction the issue and application of certain Sums of Money available under Loan Acts for Railways.
| | 2 Geo. V. No. 2347 | 8 December 1911 |
An Act to apply out of the Consolidated Revenue the sum of Six hundred and twelve thousand and fifty-six pounds to the service of the year One thousand nine hundred and eleven and One thousand nine hundred and twelve.

== Sources ==
- "1911 Victorian Historical Acts". AustLII.
