= List of acts of the Parliament of Victoria from 1940 =

This is a list of acts of the Parliament of Victoria, Australia for the year 1940.

== 1940 ==
Short title, or popular name	Citation	Royal assent
Long title
Statute Law Revision Act 1940	No. 4726	13 May 1940
An Act to revise the Statute Law and for other purposes.
	No. 4730	13 May 1940
An Act to apply out of the Consolidated Revenue the sum of One million three hundred and twenty thousand two hundred and one pounds to the service of the year One thousand nine hundred and forty and One thousand nine hundred and forty-one.
	No. 4731	1 August 1940
An Act to apply out of the Consolidated Revenue the sum of Two million nine hundred and seventy-seven thousand five hundred and forty-six pounds to the service of the year One thousand nine hundred and forty and One thousand nine hundred and forty-one.
National Security (Emergency Powers) Continuation Act 1940 (repealed)	No. 4733	9 September 1940
An Act to continue the Operation of the National Security (Emergency Powers) Act 1939. (Note: National Security (Emergency Powers) Act 1939 (No. 4645)) (Repealed by National Security (Repeal) Act 1945 (No. 5073))
	No. 4742	16 September 1940
An Act to apply out of the Consolidated Revenue the sum of One hundred and thirty-four thousand nine hundred and sixty-nine pounds to the service of the year One thousand nine hundred and thirty-nine and One thousand nine hundred and forty.
	No. 4745	30 September 1940
An Act to apply out of the Consolidated Revenue the sum of Two million eight hundred and forty thousand two hundred and one pounds to the service of the year One thousand nine hundred and forty and One thousand nine hundred and forty-one.
Public Service Act 1940 (repealed)	No. 4751	28 October 1940
An Act to provide for the Constitution of a Public Service Board and the Powers and Duties thereof and for other purposes. (Repealed by Public Service Act 1946 (No. 5124))
Administration and Probate (War Service) Act 1940	No. 4756	4 November 1940
An Act to make provision with respect to Duties under the Administration and Probate Acts in the case of Persons on War Service.
Melbourne (Widening of Streets) Act 1940 (repealed)	No. 4760	4 November 1940
An Act to provide for the Widening of the Footways of certain Streets in the City of Melbourne. (Repealed by Melbourne (Widening of Streets) (Repeal) Act 1986 (No. 97 of 1986))
Administration and Probate Duties Act 1940	No. 4766	18 November 1940
An Act to continue the operation of Part III. of the Finance Act 1930. (Note: Finance Act 1930 (No. 3889))
Public Service (Commonwealth Elections) Act 1940	No. 4767	18 November 1940
An Act to make Provision for the Appointment to the Public Service or the Railway Service of certain Persons resigning from the Service to contest Commonwealth Elections.
	No. 4780	2 December 1940
An Act to apply out of the Consolidated Revenue the sum of One million four hundred and twelve thousand seven hundred and ten pounds to the service of the year One thousand nine hundred and forty and One thousand nine hundred and forty-one.
Drought Relief Act 1940 (repealed)	No. 4782	9 December 1940
An Act to make Provision for the Relief of Farmers who have sustained Losses by reason of the Drought in Victoria during the Year One thousand nine hundred and forty. (Repealed by Public Account (Trust Funds) Act 1982 (No. 9861))
Bendigo Land Act 1940	No.	
Boilers Inspection (Air and Gas Receivers) Act 1940	No.	
Carriages Act 1940	No.	
Cemeteries (Spring Vale Necropolis) Act 1940	No.	
Companies (Special Investigations) Act 1940	No.	
Conewarre Land Act 1940	No.	
Country Roads Board Fund Act 1940	No.	
Dairy Produce Act 1940	No.	
Education (Patriotic Ceremonies) Act 1940	No.	
Factories and Shops (Bread) Act 1940	No.	
Factories and Shops (Butchers' Shops) Act 1940	No.	
Farm Produce Agents Act 1940	No.	
Farmers Protection (Amendment) Act 1940	No.	
Farmers Protection Act 1940	No.	
Financial Emergency (Grants and Funds) Act 1940	No.	
Financial Emergency (Mortgages) Act 1940	No.	
Fire Brigades (Financial) Act 1940	No.	
Fisheries Act 1940	No.	
Fitzroy Land Act 1940	No.	
Freezing Works (Overdraft Guarantee) Act 1940	No.	
Grain Elevators (Financial) Act 1940	No.	
Hawthorn Returned Sailors and Soldiers Trust Act 1940	No.	
Income Tax (Assessment) Act 1940	No.	
Income Tax (Rates) Act 1940	No.	
Industrial Life Assurance Act 1940	No.	
Land Tax Act 1940	No.	
Local Government (Building Regulations) Act 1940	No.	
Local Government (Chelsea Street Construction) Act 1940	No.	
Local Government (Rates) Act 1940	No.	
Local Government Act 1940	No.	
Margarine Act 1940	No.	
Marketing of Primary Products Act 1940	No.	
Melbourne Harbor Trust (Chairman) Act 1940	No.	
Melbourne Harbor Trust (Tolls) Act 1940	No.	
Melbourne Orphanage Act 1940	No.	
Mildura Irrigation and Water Trusts Act 1940	No.	
Nurses Act 1940	No.	
Ordinary Life Assurance Act 1940	No.	
Pawnbrokers Act 1940	No.	
Police Offences (Dog Racing) Act 1940	No.	
Police Offences (Raffles) Act 1940	No.	
Police Offences Act 1940	No.	
Public Trustee Act 1940	No.	
Public Works Loan and Application Act 1940	No.	
Public Works Loan and Application Act 1940 (No. 2)	No.	
Railway Loan and Application Act 1940	No.	
Railways (Sick Leave) Act 1940	No.	
Soil Conservation Act 1940	No.	
Stamps (Increased Duty Continuance) Act 1940	No.	
State Electricity Commission (Trading) Act 1940	No.	
State Forests Loan Application Act 1940	No.	
State Relief Committee Act 1940	No.	
Stock Foods Act 1940	No.	
Superannuation (Life Assurance Policies) Act 1940	No.	
Superannuation Act 1940	No.	
Supreme Court (Officers) Act 1940	No.	
Survey Co-ordination Act 1940	No.	
Transport Regulation (Compensation) Act 1940	No.	
Unemployment Relief Tax (Rates) Act 1940	No.	
Water (Rates and Charges) Act 1940	No.	
Water Act 1940	No.	
Water Supply Loans Application Act 1940	No.	
Workers' Compensation Act 1940	No.	

== Sources ==
- "1940 Victorian Historical Acts". AustLII.
