= List of acts of the Parliament of Victoria from 1879 =

This is a list of acts of the Parliament of Victoria, Australia for the year 1879.

== 1879 ==
The third session of the ninth parliament of Victoria.

Short title, or popular name	Citation	Royal assent
Long title
	43 Vict. No. 635	17 July 1879
An Act to apply out of the Consolidated Revenue the sum of Eight hundred thousand pounds to the service of the year One thousand eight hundred and seventy-nine and eighty.
Tollamba and Tatura Railway Construction Act 1879	43 Vict. No. 636	18 August 1879
An Act to authorize the Construction by the State of a Line of Railway from Toolamba to Tatura.
	43 Vict. No. 637	18 August 1879
An Act to resume and apply to Railway purposes certain lands in the City of Melbourne.
	43 Vict. No. 638	11 September 1879
An Act to apply out of the Consolidated Revenue the sum of Six hundred and twenty-two thousand pounds to the service of the year One thousand eight hundred and seventy-nine and eighty
	43 Vict. No. 639	11 September 1879
An Act to provide for the farther suspension of the Export Duty on Redgum Timber. (Repealed by Duties of Customs Act 1883 (47 Vict. No. 769))
	43 Vict. No. 640	29 September 1879
An Act to sanction the issue and application of a certain Sum of Money under "The Railway Loan Act 1878" for the service of the year ending the thirtieth day of June One thousand eight hundred and eighty.
	43 Vict. No. 641	29 September 1879
An Act to amend an Act intituled "An Act to incorporate the Shareholders of the National Bank of Australasia and for other purposes." (Note: 22 Vict. No. 74)
	43 Vict. No. 642	19 November 1879
An Act to apply out of the Consolidated Revenue the sum of Three hundred thousand pounds to the service of the year One thousand eight hundred and seventy-nine and eighty.
Melbourne Railway Stations Junction Act 1879	43 Vict. No. 643	19 November 1879
An Act to authorize the Construction by the State of a Junction Line of Railway in Melbourne from Spencer Street Railway Station to West Flinders Street Railway Station, and to amend "The South Yarra and Oakleigh Railway Construction Act 1878." (Note: South Yarra and Oakleigh Railway Construction Act 1878 (42 Vict. No. 604))
Executors Company's Act 1879	43 Vict. No. 644	8 December 1879
An Act to confer powers upon the Trustees Executors and Agency Company Limited.
Stamp Duties Act 1879 (repealed)	43 Vict. No. 645	17 December 1879
An Act for granting certain Stamp Duties and to provide for the management and collection thereof. (Repealed by Stamps Act 1890 (54 Vict. No. 1140))
Duties of Customs Act 1879	43 Vict. No. 646	17 December 1879
An Act for granting to Her Majesty certain Duties of Customs, for repealing and altering certain other Duties, and for other purposes.
	43 Vict. No. 647	20 December 1879
An Act to apply out of the Consolidated Revenue the sum of Two hundred and fifty thousand pounds to the service of the year One thousand eight hundred and seventy-nine and eighty.
Expiring Laws Continuance Act 1879	43 Vict. No. 648	20 December 1879
An Act to continue various Expiring Laws.
	43 Vict. No. 649	20 December 1879
An Act to provide for the alteration of the numbering of certain Acts of Parliament.

== Sources ==
- "1879 Victorian Historical Acts". AustLII.
