= List of acts of the Parliament of Victoria from 1866 =

This is a list of acts of the Parliament of Victoria, Australia for the year 1866.

== 1866 ==
The first session of the fifth parliament of Victoria.

No acts were passed during this session.

The second session of the fifth parliament of Victoria.

Short title, or popular name	Citation	Royal assent
Long title
	29 Vict. No. 293	
An Act for granting to Her Majesty certain duties of customs and for altering certain other duties. (Repealed by Customs Act 1883 (47 Vict. No. 768))
	29 Vict. No. 294	18 April 1866
An Act to apply out of the Consolidated Revenue the sum of Thirteen thousand and twenty-nine pounds twelve shillings and nine pence to the service of the year One thousand eight hundred and sixty four and One million five hundred and fifty-three thousand six hundred and sixty-seven pounds and eleven pence to the service of the year One thousand eight hundred and sixty-five and Six hundred thousand pounds to the service of the year One thousand eight hundred and sixty-six.
	29 Vict. No. 295	1 June 1866
An Act to apply a sum out of the Consolidated Revenue to the service of the year One thousand eight hundred and sixty-six and to appropriate the Supplies granted in this Session of Parliament and for other purposes.
	29 Vict. No. 296	1 June 1866
An Act to remove Doubts concerning the Law relating to the Grant of Land Certificates to Volunteers.
	29 Vict. No. 297	1 June 1866
An Act to alter the style and title of "The Australasian Fire and Life Insurance Company" and for other purposes.
Post Office Statute 1866 (repealed)	29 Vict. No. 298	1 June 1866
An Act to amend the Law relating to the Post Office. (Repealed by Post Office Act 1883 (47 Vict. No. 781))
	29 Vict. No. 299	1 June 1866
An Act to protect the Rights of Inventors of Articles exhibited at the Intercolonial Exhibition and at divers Local Exhibitions in Victoria in the year One thousand eight hundred and sixty-six.
	29 Vict. No. 300	1 June 1866
An Act to amend and explain the "Insolvency Statute 1865" (Note: Insolvency Statute 1865 (28 Vict. No. 273)) and for other purposes.
Transfer of Land Statute 1866 (repealed)	29 Vict. No. 301	1 June 1866
An Act to simplify the Title to and the dealing with Estates in Land. (Repealed by Transfer of Land Act 1890 (54 Vict. No. 1149))

== Sources ==
- "1866 Victorian Historical Acts". AustLII.
