= List of acts of the Parliament of Victoria from 1932 =

This is a list of acts of the Parliament of Victoria, Australia for the year 1932.

== 1932 ==
Short title, or popular name	Citation	Royal assent
Long title
Milk Board Act 1932 (repealed)	No. 4014	29 December 1932
An Act to make provision for the Appointment of a Milk Board and for the Powers and Duties thereof. (Repealed by Milk Board Act 1933 (No. 4183))
	No. 4018	20 April 1932
An Act to apply a sum out of the Consolidated Revenue to the service of the year ending on the thirtieth day of June One thousand nine hundred and thirty-two and to appropriate the Supplies granted in this and the last preceding Session of Parliament.
	No. 4024	30 June 1932
An Act to apply out of the Consolidated Revenue the sum of Two million three hundred and six thousand four hundred and fifty-three pounds to the service of the year One thousand nine hundred and thirty-two and One thousand nine hundred and thirty-three.
Unemployment Relief Works (Commonwealth and States) Act 1932 (repealed)	No. 4027	11 July 1932
An Act to authorize the Raising of Money by the State for the purposes of the Commonwealth Acts known as the Loan (Unemployment Relief Works) Acts 1932, (Note: Loan (Unemployment Relief Works) Act 1932 (No. 9 (Cth)); Loan (Unemployment Relief Works) Act (No. 2) 1932 (No. 23 (Cth))) and relating to the Provision by the State of certain Moneys in respect of Interest on Amounts borrowed in accordance with the said Acts by certain Authorities and Bodies of Persons and for other purposes. (Repealed by Treasury Legislation (Repeal) Act 2005 (No. 73 of 2005))
State Coal Mine Industrial Tribunal Act 1932 (repealed)	No. 4030	11 July 1932
An Act relating to the Establishment of an Industrial Tribunal with Power to determine the Rates of Pay and Conditions of Employment at or in connexion with the State Coal Mine at Wonthaggi. (Repealed by Coal Mines (Amendment) Act 1987 (No. 6 of 1987))
	No. 4037	19 July 1932
An Act to apply out of the Consolidated Revenue the sum of Five hundred and seventy-thousand five hundred and fifty-five pounds to the service of the year One thousand nine hundred and thirty-one and One thousand nine hundred and thirty-two
	No. 4040	8 September 1932
An Act to apply out of the Consolidated Revenue the sum of Nine hundred and seventy-one thousand six hundred and twenty-seven pounds to the service of the year One thousand nine hundred and thirty-two and One thousand nine hundred and thirty-three.
	No. 4049	6 October 1932
An Act to apply out of the Consolidated Revenue the sum of Nine hundred and sixty thousand two hundred and fifty-five pounds to the service of the year One thousand nine hundred and thirty-two and One thousand nine hundred and thirty-three.
	No. 4058	3 November 1932
An Act to apply out of the Consolidated Revenue the sum of Nine hundred and fifty-four thousand nine hundred and six pounds to the service of the year One thousand nine hundred and thirty-two and One thousand nine hundred and thirty-three.
Farmers Relief Act 1932 (repealed)	No. 4060	7 November 1932
An Act to amend Part II. of the Unemployed Occupiers and Farmers Relief Act 1931 (Note: Unemployed Occupiers and Farmers Relief Act 1931 (No. 3962)) as amended by any Act and for other purposes. (Repealed by Statute Law Revision Act 1995 (No. 11 of 1995))
	No. 4063	30 November 1932
An Act to apply out of the Consolidated Revenue the sum of One million and twenty-seven thousand nine hundred and sixty-nine pounds to the service of the year One thousand nine hundred and thirty-two and One thousand nine hundred and thirty-three.
Administration and Probate Duties Act 1932	No. 4066	5 December 1932
An Act to continue Part III. of the Finance Act 1930 (Note: Finance Act 1930 (No. 3889)) as amended by the Administration and Probate Duties Act 1931. (Note: Administration and Probate Duties Act 1931 (No. 4017))
Albert Park Land Act 1932 (repealed)	No. 4078	19 December 1932
An Act to revoke the Crown Grant of certain Land situate in the Municipal Districts of the City of South Melbourne and the City of St. Kilda and reserved from Sale permanently as a Site for a Public Park, and to validate certain Matters relating to the Appointment and Acts of the Committee of Management of the said Land and for other purposes. (Repealed by Statute Law Revision Act 1984 (No. 10087))
Unemployment Relief (Administration) Act 1932 (repealed)	No. 4079	21 December 1932
An Act relating to the Relief of Unemployment, and to consolidate and amend the provisions of the Unemployment Relief Amendment Act 1931 (Note: Unemployment Relief Amendment Act 1931 (No. 4000)) with respect to Collections for Unemployment, and for other purposes. (Repealed by Treasury Legislation (Repeal) Act 2005 (No. 73 of 2005))
Dried Fruits Act 1932 (repealed)	No. 4088	29 December 1932
An Act to amend the Dried Fruits Acts. (Repealed by Dried Fruits Act 1938 (No. 4594))
Boy Scouts Association Act 1932 or the Scout Association Act 1932	No. 4092	29 December 1932
An Act to incorporate the Governing Body of The Boy Scouts Association (Incorporated by Royal Charter) Victorian Branch (Australia), and to confer and impose upon that Body certain Powers Duties Rights and Liabilities and to provide for the vesting in it of the Property of the said Association in Victoria and for other purposes.
Unemployment Relief Loan and Application Act 1932 (repealed)	No. 4097	29 December 1932
An Act to authorize the raising of Money for the Relief of Unemployment and the Application of such Money, and with respect to Advances to certain Authorities and Bodies of Persons out of such Money and out of Money raised under the Authority of the Unemployment Relief Works (Commonwealth and States) Act 1932 (Note: Unemployment Relief Works (Commonwealth and States) Act 1932 (No. 4027)) or received by the State pursuant to the Commonwealth Acts known as the Loan (Unemployment Relief Works) Acts 1932, and for other purposes. (Repealed by Treasury Legislation (Repeal) Act 2005 (No. 73 of 2005))
Betting Tax (Shooting Contests) Act 1932	No.	
Blackburn and Mitcham Loan Act 1932	No.	
Brunswick Loan Act 1932	No.	
Buchan Lands Exchange Act 1932	No.	
Carriages Act 1932	No.	
Charlton Land Act 1932	No.	
Closer Settlement Act 1932	No.	
Country Roads (Traction Engine Fees) Act 1932	No.	
Country Roads Board Fund Act 1932	No.	
Country Roads Board Fund Act 1932 (No. 2)	No.	
Country Sewerage Loan Application Act 1932	No.	
Cultivation Advances Act 1932	No.	
Daylesford Land Act 1932	No.	
Deutgam Land Act 1932	No.	
Education (Fees) Act 1932	No.	
Entertainments Tax Act 1932	No.	
Factories and Shops (Sundays) Act 1932	No.	
Financial Emergency (Amendment) Act 1932	No.	
Financial Emergency (Moratorium) Act 1932	No.	
Financial Emergency (Moratorium) Act 1932 (No. 2)	No.	
Financial Emergency (Moratorium) Act 1932 (No. 3)	No.	
Financial Emergency (Mortgages) Act 1932	No.	
Financial Emergency (Railway Construction Trusts) Act 1932	No.	
Firearms Act 1932	No.	
Fisheries (Trout Licences) Act 1932	No.	
Forests Act 1932	No.	
Freezing Works (Overdraft Guarantee) Act 1932	No.	
Gormandale Land Act 1932	No.	
Government Advances (Reduction of Interest) Act 1932	No.	
Income Tax (Amendment) Act 1932	No.	
Income Tax Act 1932	No.	
Income Tax Acts Amendment Act 1932	No.	
Infectious Diseases Hospital Act 1932	No.	
Judgments (Reciprocity) Act 1932	No.	
Land Act 1932	No.	
Land Tax Act 1932	No.	
Landlord and Tenant Act 1932	No.	
Local Government (Debentures) Act 1932	No.	
Local Government Act 1932	No.	
Marriage (Validating) Act 1932	No.	
Melbourne and Geelong Debentures and Inscribed Stock Act 1932	No.	
Melbourne and Metropolitan Tramways Board Act 1932	No.	
Moorabbin Loans Act 1932	No.	
Motor Car Act 1932	No.	
Motor Omnibus (By-laws) Act 1932	No.	
Pensions Reduction Act 1932	No.	
Police Offences (False Advertisements) Act 1932	No.	
Police Offences (Race-meetings) Act 1932	No.	
Public Service Payments Reduction Act 1930 Amendment Act 1932	No.	
Public Works Loan Application Act 1932	No.	
Railway Loan Application Act 1932	No.	
Stamps (Betting Tax) Act 1932	No.	
Stamps (Unemployment Relief) Act 1932	No.	
Stamps Act 1932	No.	
State Electricity Commission (Borrowing) Act 1932	No.	
State Forests Loan Application Act 1932	No.	
State Savings Bank Act 1932	No.	
Superannuation (Retirement) Act 1932	No.	
Superannuation and Other Trust Funds Validation Act 1932	No.	
Theatres Act 1932	No.	
Thornbury Land Act 1932	No.	
Transport Regulation Act 1932	No.	
Treasury Bonds Act 1932	No.	
Treasury Overdrafts Act 1932	No.	
Unemployed Occupiers Act 1932	No.	
Unemployed Occupiers Act 1932 (No. 2)	No.	
Unemployment Relief (Amendment) Act 1932	No.	
Unemployment Relief (Amendment) Act 1932 (No. 2)	No.	
Unemployment Relief (Taxation) Act 1932	No.	
Water Supply Loans Application Act 1932	No.	
Wheat-growers Relief (Commonwealth Payment) Act 1932	No.	
Wrongs Act 1932	No.	

== Sources ==
- "1932 Victorian Historical Acts". AustLII.
