= List of acts of the Parliament of Victoria from 1924 =

This is a list of acts of the Parliament of Victoria, Australia for the year 1924.

== 1924 ==
Short title, or popular name	Citation	Royal assent
Long title
Wheat Marketing (Winding Up) Act 1924 (repealed)	15 Geo. V. No. 3338	21 May 1924
An act to provide for the Winding Up of Matters outstanding in connexion with the Administration of the Wheat Marketing Acts and the Wheat Marketing and Transportation Act 1920 (Note: Wheat Marketing and Transportation Act 1920 (11 Geo. V. No. 3076)) and for other purposes. (Repealed by Treasury Legislation (Repeal) Act 2005 (No. 73 of 2005))
	15 Geo. V. No. 3342	9 July 1924
An Act to apply out of the Consolidated Revenue the sum of One million three hundred and seventy-five thousand two hundred and forty-seven pounds to the service of the year One thousand nine hundred and twenty-four and One thousand nine hundred and twenty-five.
	15 Geo. V. No. 3343	23 July 1924
An Act to apply out of the Consolidated Revenue the sum of One million two hundred and seventy-five thousand and fifty-one pounds to the service of the year One thousand nine hundred and twenty-four and One thousand nine hundred and twenty-five.
	15 Geo. V. No. 3344	23 July 1924
An Act to apply out of the Consolidated Revenue the sum of Five hundred and eighty-two thousand two hundred and sixty pounds to the service of the year One thousand nine hundred and twenty-three and One thousand nine hundred and twenty-four.
	15 Geo. V. No. 3346	3 September 1924
An Act to apply out of the Consolidated Revenue the sum of One million two hundred and sixty-four thousand two hundred and forty-three pounds to the service of the year One thousand nine hundred and twenty-four and One thousand nine hundred and twenty-five.
Australian Wine Licence (Baillieston) Act 1924	15 Geo. V. No. 3349	1 October 1924
An Act to provide for the Renewal of a certain Australian Wine Licence in pursuance of a Certificate granted by the Licensing Court for the Licensing District of Waranga.
Club Hotel, Hopetoun, Licence Act 1924	15 Geo. V. No. 3350	1 October 1924
An Act to provide for the Renewal of a certain Victualler's Licence in pursuance of a Certificate granted by the Licensing Court for the Licensing District of Swan Hill.
Richmond Land Act 1924 (repealed)	15 Geo. V. No. 3354	1 October 1924
An Act to make further provision as to certain Lands vested in the Mayor Councillors and Citizens of the City of Richmond pursuant to Grants from the Crown and to repeal the Richmond Land Act 1912 (Note: Richmond Land Act 1912 (3 Geo. V. No. 2385)) and for other purposes. (Repealed by Statute Law Revision Act 1984 (No. 10087))
Yarram Yarram Mechanics' Institute Act 1924	15 Geo. V. No. 3355	1 October 1924
An Act relating to the Yarram Yarram Mechanics' Institute and Free Library.
	15 Geo. V. No. 3356	1 October 1924
An Act to apply out of the Consolidated Revenue the sum of One million three hundred and ninety-five thousand four hundred and forty-eight pounds to the service of the year One thousand nine hundred and twenty-four and One thousand nine hundred and twenty-five.
Audit Act 1924 (repealed)	15 Geo. V. No. 3357	1 October 1924
An Act relating to Payment of the Public Moneys. (Repealed by Audit Act 1928 (19 Geo. V. No. 3640))
North Carlton Lands Act 1924 (repealed)	15 Geo. V. No. 3358	17 October 1924
An Act to revoke the Temporary Reservation of certain Lands situate at North Carlton for Public Educational Purposes, to close a certain Right-of-way and portion of certain Streets and to provide for the Grant to the Commonwealth of Australia for Defence Purposes of certain Lands in pursuance of an Arrangement with the Commonwealth for the Exchange of certain Lands, to amend the North Carlton Lands Act 1920, (Note: North Carlton Lands Act 1920 (11 Geo. V. No. 3114)) and for other purposes. (Repealed by Statute Law Revision Act 1984 (No. 10087))
	15 Geo. V. No. 3361	30 October 1924
An Act to apply out of the Consolidated Revenue the sum of One million two hundred and seventy-four thousand two hundred and eleven pounds to the service of the year One thousand nine hundred and twenty-four and One thousand nine hundred and twenty-five.
	15 Geo. V. No. 3366	11 December 1924
An Act to apply out of the Consolidated Revenue the sum of One million three hundred and seventy-six thousand five hundred and thirteen pounds to the service of the year One thousand nine hundred and twenty-four and One thousand nine hundred and twenty-five.
Surplus Revenue Act 1924 (repealed)	15 Geo. V. No. 3371	23 December 1924
An Act relating to the Surplus Revenue of the Financial Year ended on the thirtieth day of June One thousand nine hundred and twenty-four. (Repealed by Statute Law Revision Act 1995 (No. 11 of 1995))
Melbourne Electric Supply Company Act 1924	15 Geo. V. No. 3377	30 December 1924
An Act relating to Undertakings of the Melbourne Electric Supply Company Limited and for other purposes.
Dried Fruits Act 1924 (repealed)	15 Geo. V. No. 3380	30 December 1924
An Act relating to Dried Fruits and Dried Fruits Packing Sheds and for other purposes. (Repealed by Dried Fruits Act 1928 (19 Geo. V. No. 3670))
Ballan Land Act 1924	15 Geo. V. No.	
Cattle Compensation Act 1924	15 Geo. V. No.	
Cattle Compensation Act 1924 (No. 2)	15 Geo. V. No.	
Children's Welfare Act 1924	15 Geo. V. No.	
Children's Maintenance Act 1924	15 Geo. V. No.	
Country Roads Loan Application Act 1924	15 Geo. V. No.	
Discharged Soldiers Settlement Act 1924	15 Geo. V. No.	
Electricity Supply Loan Application Act 1924	15 Geo. V. No.	
Footscray Land Act	15 Geo. V. No.	
Geelong Waterworks and Sewerage (Borrowing Powers) Act 1924	15 Geo. V. No.	
Highways and Vehicles Act 1924	15 Geo. V. No.	
Income Tax Act 1924	15 Geo. V. No.	
Industrial and Provident Societies Act 1924	15 Geo. V. No.	
Jeparit Land Act 1924	15 Geo. V. No.	
Land Tax Act 1924	15 Geo. V. No.	
Local Government (Melbourne and Geelong) Act 1924	15 Geo. V. No.	
Local Government Act 1924	15 Geo. V. No.	
Melbourne and Metropolitan Tramways (Inscribed Stock) Act 1924	15 Geo. V. No.	
Melbourne and Metropolitan Tramways Act 1924	15 Geo. V. No.	
Mildura Electricity Loan Act 1924	15 Geo. V. No.	
Milk Supply Act 1924	15 Geo. V. No.	
Motor Omnibus Act 1924	15 Geo. V. No.	
Municipal Endowment Act 1924	15 Geo. V. No.	
Public Account Advances Act 1924	15 Geo. V. No.	
Railway Loan Application Act 1924	15 Geo. V. No.	
Railways Standing Committee Act 1924	15 Geo. V. No.	
Real Property (Access of Air) Act 1924	15 Geo. V. No.	
State Savings Bank (Insurance) Act 1924	15 Geo. V. No.	
State Savings Bank Act 1924	15 Geo. V. No.	
Victorian Government Loan Act 1924	15 Geo. V. No.	
Victorian Loan (Public Works) Act 1924	15 Geo. V. No.	
Victorian Loan (State Forests) Act 1924	15 Geo. V. No.	
Victorian Wheatgrowers Corporation Limited (Government Guarantee) Act 1924	15 Geo. V. No.	
Water Supply Loans Application Act 1924	15 Geo. V. No.	
Wire Netting Act 1924	15 Geo. V. No.	

== Sources ==
- "1924 Victorian Historical Acts". AustLII.
