= List of acts of the Parliament of Victoria from 1939 =

This is a list of acts of the Parliament of Victoria, Australia for the year 1939.

== 1939 ==
| Short title, or popular name | Citation | Royal assent |
Long title
| | No. 4631 | 29 June 1939 |
An Act to apply out of the Consolidated Revenue the sum of Two million six hundred and eight thousand five hundred and one pounds to the service of the year One thousand nine hundred and thirty-nine and One thousand nine hundred and forty.
| Queenscliff Land Act 1939 | No. 4633 | 31 July 1939 |
An Act to provide for the Revocation of the Reservation of certain Land at Queenscliff permanently reserved as a Site for a Public Park and for the Reservation of such Land as a Site for a Baby Health Centre.
| Bendigo Land Act 1939 | No. 4634 | 7 August 1939 |
An Act to provide for the Revocation as to Part of a Deed of Grant to the Council of the Municipal District of Sandhurst their Successors and Assigns of certain Land in the Parish of Sandhurst, and of the Reservation or Purported Reservation of such Land as a Site for a General Market and for the Crown Grant of Part of such Land to the State Electricity Commission of Victoria, and for other purposes.
| Statute Law Revision Act 1939 | No. 4636 | 14 August 1939 |
An Act to revise the Statute Law and for other purposes.
| Yinnar Lands Act 1939 | No. 4638 | 14 August 1939 |
An Act to provide, upon the Surrender to His Majesty of certain Land in the Parish of Yinnar, for the Reservation thereof as a Site for Public Recreation, and for the Revocation of the Reservation of certain other Land in the said Parish temporarily reserved as a Site for Public Recreation, and for the Sale of Part of such Land and the Application of the Proceeds of such Sale, and for the Proclamation of the Remainder of such Land as a Road, and for other purposes.
| Keilambete Lands Exchange Act 1939 | No. 4640 | 28 August 1939 |
An Act to provide for the Revocation of the Reservation of certain Land in the Parish of Keilambete temporarily reserved as a Site for Public Purposes and for the Exchange thereof for certain other Land in the Parish of Terang to be reserved as a Site for Public Recreation and Watering Purposes.
| Motor Car (Fees) Act 1939 | No. 4642 | 28 August 1939 |
An Act to increase the Fees payable on the Registration and Renewal of Registration of certain Motor Cars.
| | No. 4643 | 31 August 1939 |
An Act to apply out of the Consolidated Revenue the sum of Three hundred and twenty-two thousand four hundred and ninety-nine pounds to the service of the year One thousand nine hundred and thirty-eight and One thousand nine hundred and thirty-nine.
| | No. 4644 | 31 August 1939 |
An Act to apply out of the Consolidated Revenue the sum of Two million eight hundred and seventy-two thousand nine hundred and fifty-nine pounds to the service of the year One thousand nine hundred and thirty-nine and One thousand nine hundred and forty.
| National Security (Emergency Powers) Act 1939 (repealed) | No. 4645 | 8 September 1939 |
An Act to make Provision with respect to the Security and Protection of the People of Victoria. (Repealed by National Security (Repeal) Act 1945 (No. 5073))
| Unemployment Relief Loan and Application Act 1939 (repealed) | No. 4656 | 18 September 1939 |
An Act to amend Section Three of the Unemployment Relief Loan and Application Act 1932. (Note: Unemployment Relief Loan and Application Act 1932 (No. 4097)) (Repealed by Treasury Legislation (Repeal) Act 2005 (No. 73 of 2005))
| Barwon River Improvement Act 1939 | No. 4657 | 18 September 1939 |
An Act relating to the Improvement of the Barwon River and for other purposes.
| Architects Act 1939 | No. 4659 | 23 October 1939 |
An Act to amend the Architects Act 1928. (Note: Architects Act 1928 (19 Geo. V. No. 3638))
| Balaclava Methodist Church Land Act 1939 | No. 4665 | 23 October 1939 |
An Act to enable the Trustees of certain Land at Balaclava in the City of St. Kilda held by them for the purposes of the Methodist Church of Australasia in Victoria to sell or otherwise deal with or dispose of the said Land, and for other purposes.
| Shepparton Land Act 1939 | No. 4669 | 30 October 1939 |
An Act to provide for the Revocation of the Reservation of certain Land in the Parish of Shepparton permanently reserved as a Site for an Agricultural High School and for the Revocation of the Crown Grant of such Land and for the Disposal of such Land, and for other purposes.
| | No. 4671 | 1 November 1939 |
An Act to apply out of the Consolidated Revenue the sum of Two million six hundred and eighty-nine thousand seven hundred and ninety-two pounds to the service of the year One thousand nine hundred and thirty-nine and One thousand nine hundred and forty.
| Forests (Exchange of Lands) Act 1939 | No. 4673 | 6 November 1939 |
An Act to make provision with respect to the Exchange of Forest Land for Unoccupied Crown Land.
| Acts Interpretation (Amendment) Act 1939 | No. 4683 | 27 November 1939 |
An Act to amend Section Twenty-five of the Acts Interpretation Act 1928. (Note: Acts Interpretation Act 1928 (19 Geo. V. No. 3630))
| Wills (War Service) Act 1939 | No. 4684 | 27 November 1939 |
An Act to amend Section Ten of the Wills Act 1928. (Note: Wills Act 1928 (19 Geo. V. No. 3803))
| Ballaarat Public Hall Act 1939 | No. 4687 | 27 November 1939 |
An Act to provide for the Revocation of the Approval as a Site for a Hay Corn and General Market and the Reservation as a Site for a Market of Certain Land in the City of Ballaarat and for the Reservation of such Land as a Site for a Public Hall, and to empower the Council of the City of Ballaarat to borrow Money for the Purpose of the Erection Fitting and Furnishing of a Public Hall thereon, and for other purposes.
| Motor Car (Third-Party Insurance) Act 1939 | No. 4688 | 4 December 1939 |
An Act to require the Owners of Motor Cars to insure against Liability in respect of Deaths or Bodily Injuries caused by the Use of such Motor Cars, to enable Insurance in relation to Motor Cars to be undertaken by the State, and for other purposes.
| Local Government (Mordialloc Street Construction) Act 1939 | No. 4690 | 4 December 1939 |
An Act relating to certain Streets in the City of Mordialloc.
| Electoral Act 1939 | No. 4691 | 8 December 1939 |
An Act to amend the Law relating to Parliamentary Elections.
| Administration and Probate Duties Act 1939 | No. 4695 | 8 December 1939 |
An Act to continue the operation of Part III. of the Finance Act 1930. (Note: Finance Act 1930 (No. 3889))
| Preston (Bruce-street) Land Act 1939 | No. 4696 | 8 December 1939 |
An Act to provide for the Closing of Portion of a certain Street in the City of Preston, to vest in His Majesty the Land upon which the said Portion of the said Street is set out and to provide for the Reservation of the said Land for Educational and Recreation purposes, and for other purposes.
| University (Veterinary Research) Act 1939 | No. 4698 | 8 December 1939 |
An Act to amend Section Three of the University Act Amendment Act 1930. (Note: University Act Amendment Act 1930 (No. 3942))
| Carboor and Moyhu Lands Act 1939 | No. 4699 | 8 December 1939 |
An Act to provide for the Revocation of the Reservation of certain Land in the Parish of Carboor reserved as a Site for Public Recreation and for the Sale of such Land and for the Application of the Proceeds of such Sale towards recouping the Cost of the Purchase of other Land in the Parish of Moyhu to be reserved as a Site for Public Recreation, and for other purposes.
| Omeo Hospital Lands Act 1939 | No. 4700 | 8 December 1939 |
An Act to provide, upon the Transfer and Surrender of certain Lands at Omeo to His Majesty, for the Reservation of such Lands as a Site for Hospital purposes and for the Revocation of the Reservations of certain other Lands at Omeo temporarily reserved for Hospital purposes and for the Sale of such other Lands and for the Application of the Proceeds of such Sale, and for other purposes.
| Castlemaine Hospital Lands Act 1939 (repealed) | No. 4706 | 18 December 1939 |
An Act to provide for the Revocation of the Reservations of certain Lands at Castlemaine reserved as Sites for Hospital Purposes and for the Sale of such Lands and for the Application of the Proceeds of such Sale towards recouping the Cost of the Purchase of other Land at Castlemaine to be reserved as a Site for Hospital Purposes, and for other purposes. (Repealed by Statute Law Revision Act 1984 (No. 10087))
| Port Fairy Lands Act 1939 | No. 4707 | 18 December 1939 |
An Act to provide upon the Transfer and Surrender to His Majesty of certain Lands in the Parish of Belfast for the Reservation of such Lands as Sites for Water Supply purposes and for the Revocation of the Reservation of certain other Land in the Parishes of Bootahpool and Warrong reserved as a Site for Water Supply purposes and for the Closing of a Road upon such other Land and for the Sale of such other Land and for the Application of the Proceeds of such Sale, and for other purposes.
| Fitzroy (Regent-street) Land Act 1939 | No. 4709 | 18 December 1939 |
An Act to provide for the Closing of Portion of a Street known as Regent-street in the City of Fitzroy, the Vesting in His Majesty of the Land upon which the said Portion of the said Street is set out and the Grant of the said Land to the Mother Rectress of St. Vincent's Hospital and certain other Members of the Religious Order known as the Sisters of Charity administering the Affairs of the said Hospital.
| Melbourne and Metropolitan Tramways (Omnibuses) Act 1939 | No. 4710 | 18 December 1939 |
An Act to amend Paragraph (j) of Section Fifty-nine of the Melbourne and Metropolitan Tramways Act 1928. (Note: Melbourne and Metropolitan Tramways Act 1928 (19 Geo. V. No. 3732))
| Ballaarat Lands Act 1939 | No. 4716 | 18 December 1939 |
An Act to provide for the Revocation of the Reservations of certain Lands in the City of Ballaarat permanently reserved as Sites for Market Purposes and for Offices of the Ballaarat District Benevolent Asylum and Lying-in Hospital respectively and for the Revocation of the Crown Grants of such Lands, and for the Repeal of the Ballaarat Court House Land Act 1902 (Note: Ballaarat Court House Land Act 1902 (3 Edw. VII. No. 1814)) and for the Revocation of the Setting apart of certain Land in the said City thereunder, and for the Reservation of a Part of the said Lands as a Site for Public Offices, and for the Revocation of the Reservation of certain other Land in the said City permanently reserved as a Site for Public Offices, and for the Re-definition of the Boundaries of certain Land in the said City permanently reserved and granted as a Site for a Free Library and Reading Rooms, and for other purposes.
| Patriotic Funds Act 1939 | No. 4717 | 18 December 1939 |
An Act to make Provision with respect to the Regulation and Control of the Raising and Collection of Moneys for Patriotic Funds in connexion with the Present War, and for purposes connected therewith.
| Members of Parliament (Disqualification) Act 1939 | No. 4718 | 18 December 1939 |
An Act to remove Doubts as to the Scope of certain Provisions of The Constitution Act Amendment Act 1928 (Note: Constitution Act Amendment Act 1928 (19 Geo. V. No. 3660)) and to amend Sections Twenty-seven and Twenty-eight of the said Act.
| Motor Car (Illegal Use) Act 1939 | No. 4719 | 18 December 1939 |
An Act to amend Section Nineteen of the Motor Car Act 1930. (Note: Motor Car Act 1930 (No. 3901))
| | No. 4720 | 18 December 1939 |
An Act to apply a sum out of the Consolidated Revenue to the service of the year ending on the thirtieth day of June One thousand nine hundred and forty and to appropriate the Supplies granted in this Session of Parliament.
| Births Notification Act 1939 | No. | |
| Bush Fire Brigades Act 1939 | No. | |
| Country Roads Board Fund Act 1939 | No. | |
| Developmental Railways (Financial) Act 1939 | No. | |
| Dog Act 1939 | No. | |
| Execution of Instruments Act 1939 | No. | |
| Execution of Trusts Act 1939 | No. | |
| Factories and Shops (Fruit Shops) Act 1939 | No. | |
| Fair Rents (War Suspension) Act 1939 | No. | |
| Farm Produce Agents Act 1939 | No. | |
| Farmers Debts Adjustment Act 1939 | No. | |
| Financial Emergency (Grants and Funds) Act 1939 | No. | |
| Financial Emergency (Mortgages) Act 1939 | No. | |
| Forests Act 1939 | No. | |
| Freezing Works (Overdraft Guarantee) Act 1939 | No. | |
| Friendly Societies (War Service) Act 1939 | No. | |
| Grain Elevators (Financial) Act 1939 | No. | |
| Hairdressers Registration Act 1939 | No. | |
| Health (Sale of Horseflesh) Act 1939 | No. | |
| Horse Breeding Act 1939 | No. | |
| Hospitals and Charities (Fund) Act 1939 | No. | |
| Hospitals and Charities Act 1939 | No. | |
| Income Tax (Assessment) Amendment Act 1939 | No. | |
| Income Tax (Rates) Act 1939 | No. | |
| Instruments (Insurance Contracts) Act 1939 | No. | |
| Land (Residence Areas) Act 1939 | No. | |
| Land Tax Act 1939 | No. | |
| Local Government (Temporary Reduction of Interest) Act 1939 | No. | |
| Marketing of Primary Products (Validation) Act 1939 | No. | |
| Mental Deficiency Act 1939 | No. | |
| Milk Board Act 1939 | No. | |
| Mines (Petroleum) Act 1939 | No. | |
| Pawnbrokers Act 1939 | No. | |
| Police Offences (Gaming) Act 1939 | No. | |
| Public Trustee Act 1939 | No. | |
| Public Works Loan and Application Act 1939 | No. | |
| Railway Loan Application Act 1939 | No. | |
| Sewerage Districts (Temporary Reduction of Interest) Act 1939 | No. | |
| Sheep Owners Protection Act 1939 | No. | |
| Slum Reclamation and Housing Act 1939 | No. | |
| Stamps (Increased Duty Continuance) Act 1939 | No. | |
| State Forests (Timber Salvage) Loan and Application Act 1939 | No. | |
| State Savings Bank (Commissioners) Act 1939 | No. | |
| Supreme Court Act 1939 | No. | |
| Transfer of Land (Forgeries) Act 1939 | No. | |
| Transport Regulation (Amendment) Act 1939 | No. | |
| Treasury Bonds Act 1939 | No. | |
| Treasury Overdrafts Act 1939 | No. | |
| Trustee Act 1939 | No. | |
| Unemployment Relief Tax (Rates) Act 1939 | No. | |
| Water Act 1939 | No. | |
| Water Supply Loans Application Act 1939 | No. | |
| Weights and Measures Act 1939 | No. | |

== Sources ==
- "1939 Victorian Historical Acts". AustLII.
