= List of acts of the Parliament of Victoria from 1875 =

This is a list of acts of the Parliament of Victoria, Australia for the year 1875.

== 1875 ==
The second session of the eighth parliament of Victoria.

Short title, or popular name	Citation	Royal assent
Long title
	39 Vict. No. 507	29 June 1875
An Act to apply out of the Consolidated Revenue the sum of Sixty-one thousand three hundred and thirty-eight pounds eight shillings and seven-pence to the service of the Year One thousand eight hundred and seventy-four and five, and the sum of Four hundred and fifty thousand pounds to the service of the year One thousand eight hundred and seventy-five and six.
	39 Vict. No. 508	7 September 1875
An Act to apply out of the Consolidated Revenue the sum of Seven hundred thousand pounds to the service of the year One thousand eight hundred and seventy-five and six.
	39 Vict. No. 509	6 October 1875
An Act to sanction the issue and expenditure of certain Sums from "The Railway Loan Account" and from "The Public Works Loan Account 1872" for Salaries Wages and Contingencies for the service of the year ending the Thirtieth day of June One thousand eight hundred and seventy-six.
Melbourne Orphan Asylum Sale Act 1875	39 Vict. No. 510	19 October 1875
An Act to enable the Melbourne Orphan Asylum Corporation to sell and otherwise deal with certain Land situate at Emerald Hill vested in such Corporation as a site for an Asylum for Orphan Children and for other purposes.
Church of England Act 1875	39 Vict. No. 511	19 October 1875
An Act to authorize the sale of Trust Lands and the application of the proceeds and of Trust Moneys in the purchase of a Site and building thereon a Church for the Members of the Church of England in the Parish of Prahran.
	39 Vict. No. 512	19 October 1875
An Act to apply out of the Consolidated Revenue the sum of One hundred and sixty thousand pounds to the service of the year One thousand eight hundred and seventy-five and six.
	39 Vict. No. 513	1 December 1875
An Act to apply out of the Consolidated Revenue the sum of Three hundred and eighty-two thousand five hundred pounds to the service of the year One thousand eight hundred and seventy-five and six.
	39 Vict. No. 514	
An Act to extend the time for the Collection of Tolls.
Land Act 1875 (repealed)	39 Vict. No. 515	23 December 1875
An Act to re-adjust the rate of Rent payable by Pastoral Tenants of the Crown. (Repealed by Land Act 1884 (48 Vict. No. 812)

== Sources ==
- "1875 Victorian Historical Acts". AustLII.
