= List of acts of the Parliament of Victoria from 1874 =

This is a list of acts of the Parliament of Victoria, Australia for the year 1874.

== 1874 ==
The first session of the eighth parliament of Victoria.

Short title, or popular name	Citation	Royal assent
Long title
	38 Vict. No. 481	23 June 1874
An Act to extend the Powers of the Acting Engineer-in-Chief of the Victorian Railways.
	38 Vict. No. 482	23 June 1874
An Act to apply out of the Consolidated Revenue the sum of One hundred and five thousand three hundred and sixty-five pounds six shillings and ten pence to the service of the year One thousand eight hundred and seventy-three and four, and the sum of Five hundred thousand pounds to the service of the year One thousand eight hundred and seventy-four and five.
	38 Vict. No. 483	11 August 1874
An Act to sanction the issue and application of certain Sums of Money from "The Railway Loan Account," for Salaries Wages and Contingencies for the Service of the year One thousand eight hundred and seventy-four and One thousand eight hundred and seventy-five.
	38 Vict. No. 484	11 August 1874
An Act to apply out of the Consolidated Revenue the sum of Two hundred and twenty-seven thousand and seven hundred pounds to the service of the year One thousand eight hundred and seventy-four and five.
Interpretation of Acts Amendment Act 1874 (repealed)	38 Vict. No. 485	10 September 1874
An Act to amend "An Act for the Interpretation of Legislative Enactments and for shortening the language used therein." (Note: 21 Vict. No. 22) (Repealed by Acts Interpretation Act 1890 (54 Vict. No. 1058))
	38 Vict. No. 486	
An Act to sanction the issue and expenditure of certain sums from "The Public Works Loan Account 1872" for Salaries, Wages, and Contingencies for the service of the year ending the thirtieth day of June One thousand eight hundred and seventy-five.
	38 Vict. No. 487	
An Act to sanction the issue and expenditure of certain sums from "The Public Works Loan Account 1872" for Salaries, Wages, and Contingencies for the service of the year ending the thirtieth day of June One thousand eight hundred and seventy-five.
	38 Vict. No. 488	
An Act to apply out of the consolidated revenue the sum of Five hundred thousand pounds to the service of the year One thousand eight hundred and seventy-four and five.
Duties of Customs Amendment Act 1874 (repealed)	38 Vict. No. 489	27 October 1874
An Act to alter certain Duties of Customs, and to repeal other Duties of Customs. (Repealed by Duties of Customs Act 1877 (41 Vict. No. 593))
Bank of Victoria Act 1874	38 Vict. No. 490	8 December 1874
An Act to continue the powers of an Act intituled; "An Act to incorporate the Proprietors of a certain Banking Company called 'The Bank of Victoria' and for other purposes therein mentioned." (Note: Bank of Victoria Act 1854 (17 Vict.))
	38 Vict. No. 491	8 December 1874
An Act to apply out of the Consolidated Revenue the sum of Five hundred thousand pounds to the service of the year One thousand eight hundred and seventy-four and five.
	38 Vict. No. 492	
An Act to apply a sum out of the consolidated revenue to the service of the year ending on the last day of June One thousand eight hundred and seventy-five, and to appropriate the Supplies granted in this session of Parliament.
Building Societies Act 1874 (repealed)	38 Vict. No. 493	24 December 1874
An Act to amend the law relating to Building Societies. (Repealed by Building Societies Act 1890 (54 Vict. No. 1068))
	38 Vict. No. 494	24 December 1874
An Act for the continuation of an expiring law.
Neglected and Criminal Children's Amendment Act 1874 (repealed)	38 Vict. No. 495	24 December 1874
An Act to amend the Law relating to Neglected and Criminal Children. (Repealed by Juvenile Offenders Act 1887 (51 Vict. No. 951))
Public Works Loan Act Amendment Act 1874	38 Vict. No. 496	24 December 1874
An Act to amend the "Public Works Loan Act 1872." (Note: Public Works Loan Act 1872 (36 Vict. No. 428))
	38 Vict. No. 497	24 December 1874
An Act to sanction the issue and expenditure of certain sums from "The Public Works Loan Account 1872" for Salaries, Wages, and Contingencies for the service of the year ending the thirtieth day of June One thousand eight hundred and seventy-five.
	38 Vict. No. 498	24 December 1874
An Act for the continuation of an expiring law.
	38 Vict. No. 499	24 December 1874
An Act for the continuation of an expiring law.
	38 Vict. No. 500	24 December 1874
An Act to amend "The Local Governing Bodies Loan Act 1872." (Note: Local Governing Bodies Loan Act 1872 (36 Vict. No. 448)) (Repealed by Water Act 1890 (54 Vict. No. 1156))
Compulsory Vaccination Act 1874 (repealed)	38 Vict. No. 501	24 December 1874
An Act to amend the Law relating to Compulsory Vaccination. (Repealed by Health Act 1890 (54 Vict. No. 1098))
	38 Vict. No. 502	24 December 1874
An Act to erect a new Court for the Trial of Offences, to establish uniformity of venue in Civil and Criminal Judicature, and to amend the practice and procedure of Courts of Criminal Jurisdiction.
Customs Act 1874 (repealed)	38 Vict. No. 503	24 December 1874
An Act to further amend the Law relating to the Customs. (Repealed by Customs Act 1883 (47 Vict. No. 768))
	38 Vict. No. 504	24 December 1874
An Act to amend "The Mining Statute 1865 Amendment Act." (Note: Mining Statute 1865 Amendment Act 1872 (36 Vict. No. 446))
	38 Vict. No. 505	24 December 1874
An Act to sanction the issue and application of certain sums of money from "The Railway Loan Liquidation and Construction Account," established under the provision of section forty-two of 33 Vict. No. 360. (Note: Land Act 1869 (33 Vict. No. 360))
Local Government Act 1874	38 Vict. No. 506	24 December 1874
An Act to consolidate and amend the Laws relating to Local Government.

== Sources ==
- "1874 Victorian Historical Acts". AustLII.
