= List of acts of the Parliament of Victoria from 1868 =

This is a list of acts of the Parliament of Victoria, Australia for the year 1868.

== 1868 ==
The fifth session of the fifth parliament of Victoria.

Short title, or popular name	Citation	Royal assent
Long title
	31 Vict. No. 326	
An Act for the continuation of an expiring law.

The first session of the sixth parliament of Victoria.

Short title, or popular name	Citation	Royal assent
Long title
	32 Vict. No. 327	13 July 1868
An Act to apply the sum of One million nine hundred and fifty thousand pounds out of the Consolidated Revenue to the services of the Years One thousand eight hundred and sixty seven and One thousand eight hundred and sixty-eight.
	32 Vict. No. 328	
An Act for the continuation of an expiring law. (Repealed by Scab Act 1870 (34 Vict. No. 370))
	32 Vict. No. 329	29 September 1868
An Act to explain and amend the "Friendly Societies Statute 1865." (Note: Friendly Societies Statute 1865 (28 Vict. No. 254)) (Repealed by Friendly Societies Act 1890 (54 Vict. No. 1094))
	32 Vict. No. 330	29 September 1868
An Act to Vest the Lines of Railway of the Melbourne and Essendon Railway Company in the Board of Land and Works, and for other purposes.
Railway Loan Act 1868	32 Vict. No. 331	29 September 1868
An Act to authorize the raising of Money for Railways and for other purposes.
Public Works Loan Act 1868	32 Vict. No. 332	29 September 1868
An Act to authorize the raising of Money for Public Works and other purposes.
	32 Vict. No. 333	29 September 1868
An Act to adopt the British Pharmacopœia. (Repealed by Medical Act 1890 (54 Vict. No. 1118))
Legislative Council Amendment Act 1868 (repealed)	32 Vict. No. 334	29 September 1868
An Act to alter the Qualifications of Members and Electors of the Legislative Council. (Repealed by Legislative Council Act 1881 (45 Vict. No. 702))

The second session of the sixth parliament of Victoria.

Short title, or popular name	Citation	Royal assent
Long title
	32 Vict. No. 335	29 September 1868
An Act to apply a sum out of the Consolidated Revenue to the services of the years One thousand eight hundred and sixty-six, One thousand eight hundred and sixty-seven, and One thousand eight hundred and sixty-eight respectively, and to appropriate the Supplies granted in this Session of Parliament and for other purposes.

== Sources ==
- "1868 Victorian Historical Acts". AustLII.
