= List of acts of the Parliament of Victoria from 1895 =

This is a list of acts of the Parliament of Victoria, Australia for the year 1895.

== 1895 ==
| Short title, or popular name | Citation | Royal assent |
Long title
| Elections and Qualifications Committees Act 1895 (repealed) | 58 Vict. No. 1368 | 23 January 1895 |
An Act to empower Committees of Elections and Qualifications to meet on days on which the Legislative Council or Assembly does not sit. (Repealed by Constitution Act Amendment Act 1915 (6 Geo. V. No. 2632))
| Victorian Government Stock Act 1895 | 58 Vict. No. 1369 | 29 January 1895 |
An Act to authorize the raising of money for certain purposes by increasing the amount of Victorian Government Stock and for other purposes.
| Standard Time Act 1895 (repealed) | 58 Vict. No. 1370 | 29 January 1895 |
An Act to establish a Standard of Time in Victoria. (Repealed by Supreme Court Act 1915 (6 Geo. V. No. 2733))
| Jumbunna and Outtrim Railway Construction Act 1895 | 58 Vict. No. 1371 | 29 January 1895 |
An Act to authorize the construction by the State of a Line of Railway from Jumbunna to Outtrim.
| Acting Victorian Railways Commissioners Act 1895 | 58 Vict. No. 1372 | 29 January 1895 |
An Act to Validate the Appointments of the Acting Victorian Railways Commissioners and to provide for the further Appointment of Acting Commissioners until the thirtieth day of June One thousand eight hundred and ninety-five.
| Members' Reimbursement Reduction Act 1895 | 58 Vict. No. 1373 | 29 January 1895 |
An Act for the Reduction of the rate of Reimbursement of Expenses payable to Members of the Legislative Assembly.
| Income Tax Act 1895 (repealed) | 58 Vict. No. 1374 | 29 January 1895 |
An Act to impose a Tax on Income. (Repealed by Income Tax Act 1915 (6 Geo. V. No. 2668))
| Judges' Salaries Act 1895 (repealed) | 58 Vict. No. 1375 | 29 January 1895 |
An Act to reduce the Rates of Salaries of future Judges of the Supreme Court. (Repealed by Supreme Court Act 1915 (6 Geo. V. No. 2733))
| Water Supply Loans Application Act 1895 | 58 Vict. No. 1376 | 29 January 1895 |
An Act to sanction the issue and application of certain sums of money as Loans for Water Supply and Irrigation Works in the Country Districts and for other purposes.
| Railways Commissioners Superannuation Act 1895 | 58 Vict. No. 1377 | 29 January 1895 |
An Act to provide for the payment of Superannuation Allowances to the late Victorian Railways Commissioners.
| Mallee Tanks Act 1895 | 58 Vict. No. 1378 | 29 January 1895 |
An Act to sanction the issue and application of certain sums of money as Loans to certain Shire Councils to Construct Tanks for Water Supply in the Mallee Country.
| Municipal Endowment Reduction Act 1895 | 58 Vict. No. 1379 | 29 January 1895 |
An Act to Further Reduce the Municipal Endowment and for other purposes.
| Companies' Documents Act 1895 | 58 Vict. No. 1380 | 29 January 1895 |
An Act relating to the Loss or Destruction of certain Documents of Companies.
| Railways Validation Act 1895 | 58 Vict. No. 1381 | 29 January 1895 |
An Act to validate the Construction of certain Lines of Railway and the expenditure incurred in the Construction of certain other Lines of Railway.
| Teachers Act 1895 (repealed) | 58 Vict. No. 1382 | 29 January 1895 |
An Act to provide for re-grading State Schools for the Classification of Teachers and regulating their Salaries and for other purposes. (Repealed by Public Service Act 1915 (6 Geo. V. No. 2713))
| Wycheproof and Sea Lake Railway Construction Act 1895 | 58 Vict. No. 1383 | 29 January 1895 |
An Act to authorize the Construction by the State of a Line of Railway from Wycheproof to Sea Lake.
| Mines Act 1895 | 58 Vict. No. 1384 | 29 January 1895 |
An Act to further amend the Mines Act 1890. (Note: Mines Act 1890 (54 Vict. No. 1120))
| | 58 Vict. No. 1385 | 29 January 1895 |
An Act to apply a sum out of the Consolidated Revenue to the service of the year ending on the thirtieth day of June One thousand eight hundred and ninety-five and to appropriate the Supplies granted in this and the last preceding Session of Parliament.
| Treasury Bills Act 1895 | 58 Vict. No. 1386 | 29 January 1895 |
An Act to authorize the issue of Treasury Bills.
| Legal Profession Practice Act 1895 (repealed) | 58 Vict. No. 1387 | 29 January 1895 |
An Act to amend the Law relating to Barristers and Solicitors. (Repealed by Legal Profession Practice Act 1915 (6 Geo. V. No. 2681))
| Landlord and Tenant Act 1895 (repealed) | 58 Vict. No. 1388 | 29 January 1895 |
An Act to amend the Landlord and Tenant Act 1890. (Note: Landlord and Tenant Act 1890 (54 Vict. No. 1108)) (Repealed by Landlord and Tenant Act 1915 (6 Geo. V. No. 2677))
| Mildura Rating Act 1895 | 58 Vict. No. 1389 | 29 January 1895 |
An Act to further continue and amend the Mildura Rating Act 1893 (Note: Mildura Rating Act 1893 (57 Vict. No. 1304)) and for other purposes.
| Supreme Court Act Explanation Act 1895 (repealed) | 58 Vict. No. 1390 | 29 January 1895 |
An Act to declare the Law relating to the powers of Justices Courts of Petty Sessions and Licensing Courts in respect to boundaries of bailiwicks. (Repealed by Justices Act 1915 (6 Geo. V. No. 2675))
| Juries Act 1895 (repealed) | 59 Vict. No. 1391 | 10 July 1895 |
An Act to amend the Juries Act 1890 (Note: Juries Act 1890 (54 Vict. No. 1104)) and for other purposes. (Repealed by Juries Act 1915 (6 Geo. V. No. 2674))
| Supreme Court Act 1895 (repealed) | 59 Vict. No. 1392 | 10 July 1895 |
An Act to further amend the Supreme Court Act 1890 (Note: Supreme Court Act 1890 (54 Vict. No. 1142)) and for other purposes. (Repealed by Supreme Court Act 1915 (6 Geo. V. No. 2733))
| Governor's Salary Reduction Act 1895 (repealed) | 59 Vict. No. 1393 | 15 July 1895 (Note: This act was reserved for approval by Her Majesty.) |
An Act to reduce the sum appropriated to the payment of the Salary of every future Governor of Victoria. (Repealed by Constitution Act Amendment Act 1915 (6 Geo. V. No. 2632))
| Ministers' Salaries Act 1895 | 59 Vict. No. 1394 | 15 July 1895 |
An Act to Reduce the Rates of Salaries of Responsible Ministers of the Crown.
| | 59 Vict. No. 1395 | 30 July 1895 |
An Act to apply out of the Consolidated Revenue the sum of One million one hundred and twenty-one thousand nine hundred and ninety-five pounds to the service of the year One thousand eight hundred and ninety-five and ninety-six.
| Mildura Rating Act 1895 (No. 2) | 59 Vict. No. 1396 | 28 August 1895 |
An Act to provide facilities for carrying out certain of the provisions of the Water Act 1890 (Note: Water Act 1890 (54 Vict. No. 1156)) at Mildura and for other purposes.
| Goldsbrough Mort and Company Limited Arrangement Act 1895 (repealed) | 59 Vict. No. 1397 | 26 September 1895 |
An Act to confirm a Scheme of Arrangement between Goldsbrough Mort and Company Limited its Debenture-holders and Contributories. (Repealed by Statute Law Repeals Act 2007 (No. 21 of 2007))
| Municipalities' Advances Act 1895 | 59 Vict. No. 1398 | 14 October 1895 |
An Act to authorize Advances to be made to certain Municipalities.
| | 59 Vict. No. 1399 | 24 October 1895 |
An Act to apply out of the Consolidated Revenue the sum of One million and forty-two thousand six hundred and eighty pounds to the service of the year One thousand eight hundred and ninety-five and ninety-six.
| Land Surveyors Act 1895 (repealed) | 59 Vict. No. 1400 | 18 November 1895 |
An Act to regulate the Licensing of Surveyors and for other purposes. (Repealed by Land Surveyors Act 1915 (6 Geo. V. No. 2679))
| Customs and Excise Duties Act 1895 | 59 Vict. No. 1401 | 18 November 1895 |
An Act for Granting Amending and Consolidating Duties of Customs and Excise.
| Marong Reserve Mining Act 1895 (repealed) | 59 Vict. No. 1402 | 18 November 1895 |
An Act to provide for Mining on the Marong Public Recreation Reserve by holders of miners' rights. (Repealed by Statute Law Repeals Act 2007 (No. 21 of 2007))
| | 59 Vict. No. 1403 | 26 November 1895 |
An Act to apply out of the Consolidated Revenue the sum of Seventy-four thousand nine hundred and nine pounds to the service of the year One thousand eight hundred and ninety-four and ninety-five.
| Municipal Overdrafts (Indemnity) Act 1895 | 59 Vict. No. 1404 | 26 November 1895 |
An Act to indemnify the Councillors of various Municipalities for Borrowing Moneys by Overdrafts on Bankers for the purposes of their Municipalities contrary to the provisions of the Local Government Act 1890 (Note: Local Government Act 1890 (54 Vict. No. 1112)) and for other purposes.
| Cape Patterson and Kilcunda Junction Railway Act Fourth Amendment Act 1895 | 59 Vict. No. 1405 | 24 December 1895 |
An Act to amend and continue an Act intituled "An Act to authorize the construction of the Cape Patterson and Kilcunda Junction Railway and for other purposes." (Note: Cape Patterson and Kilcunda Junction Railway Act 1888 (52 Vict. No. 980))
| Printers and Newspapers Act 1895 (repealed) | 59 Vict. No. 1406 | 24 December 1895 |
An Act to amend the Printers and Newspapers Act 1890. (Note: Printers and Newspapers Act 1890 (54 Vict. No. 1130)) (Repealed by Printers and Newspapers Act 1915 (6 Geo. V. No. 2711))
| Ararat Mechanics' Institute Land Act 1895 | 59 Vict. No. 1407 | 24 December 1895 |
An Act to provide for the Sale of certain Land set apart as a Site for a Mechanics' Institute at Ararat.
| | 59 Vict. No. 1408 | 24 December 1895 |
An Act to apply out of the Consolidated Revenue the sum of Three hundred and twenty-one thousand six hundred and seventy-seven pounds to the service of the year One thousand eight hundred and ninety-five and ninety-six.
| Mildura Irrigation Trusts Act 1895 | 59 Vict. No. 1409 | 24 December 1895 |
An Act to constitute Irrigation Trusts within the Irrigation Colony of Mildura and to invest such Trusts with certain powers and for other purposes.
| Income Tax Rate Act 1895 (repealed) | 59 Vict. No. 1410 | 24 December 1895 |
An Act to declare the Rates of Duties of Income Tax for the Year ending on the thirty-first day of December One thousand eight hundred and ninety-six. (Repealed by Income Tax Act 1915 (6 Geo. V. No. 2668))

== Sources ==
- "1895 Victorian Historical Acts". AustLII.
