= List of acts of the Parliament of Victoria from 1975 =

This is a list of acts of the Parliament of Victoria, Australia for the year 1975.

== 1975 ==
Short title, or popular name	Citation	Royal assent
Long title
Scaffolding (Amendment) Act 1975 (Note: Two acts were given the short title 'Scaffolding (Amendment) Act 1975', act No. 8666 and act No. 8802.) (repealed)	No. 8666	
(Repealed by Statute Law Revision Act 1984 (No. 10087))
Methodist Church of Australasia Supernumerary Ministers and Ministers' Widows Fund Act 1975	No. 8668	15 April 1975
An Act to make further provision with respect to the Methodist Church (Victoria) Property Trust and with respect to the Methodist Church of Australasia Supernumerary Ministers and Ministers' Widows Fund and for other purposes.
Heathcote Railway Removal Act 1975 (repealed)	No. 8682	29 April 1975
An Act to provide for the Removal of a Section of the Wandong, Heathcote and Sandhurst Railway and for Purposes connected therewith. (Repealed by Transport Act 1983 (No. 9921))
Melbourne (Snowden Gardens) Land Act 1975	No. 8685	2 May 1975
An Act relating to Certain Lands in the Cities of Melbourne arid South Melbourne.
Building Industry Long Service Leave Act 1975	No. 8693	6 May 1975
An Act to make special provision in relation to Long Service Leave for Persons employed in the Building and Construction Industry, to amend the Labour and Industry Act 1958, (Note: Labour and Industry Act 1958 (No. 6283)) and for other purposes.
Professional Boxing Control Act 1975	No. 8697	16 May 1975
An Act to regulate and control the Conduct of Professional Boxing Contests.
Wildlife Act 1975	No. 8699	16 May 1975
An Act to re-enact with Amendments the Provisions of the Game Act 1958 (Note: Game Act 1958 (No. 6258)) and Sections 9 and 10 of the Protection of Animals Act 1966. (Note: Protection of Animals Act 1966 (No. 7432))
Social Welfare (Amendment) Act 1975 (Note: Two acts were both given the short title 'Social Welfare (Amendment) Act 1975'.)	No. 8701	16 May 1975
An Act to amend Part IV. of the Social Welfare Act 1970, (Note: Social Welfare Act 1970 (No. 8089)) the Social Welfare (Amendment) Act 1973, (Note: Social Welfare (Amendment) Act 1973 (No. 8426)) the Justices Act 1958, (Note: Justices Act 1958 (No. 6282)) and the Magistrates' Courts Act 1971. (Note: Magistrates' Courts Act 1971 (No. 8184))
Industrial Training Act 1975	No. 8706	16 May 1975
An Act to amend and consolidate the Law relating to Industrial Training.
National Parks Act 1975	No. 8702	16 May 1975
An Act to consolidate amend and make further provision in the law relating to national parks, to make provision for certain other parks, to make consequential amendments to certain Acts and for other purposes.
Town and Country Planning (Outdoor Advertising) Act 1975 (repealed)	No. 8716	16 May 1975
An Act to make provision for the Control of Outdoor Advertising, and for that purpose to amend the Town and Country Planning Act 1961 (Note: Town and Country Planning Act 1961 (No. 6849)) the Local Government Act 1958 (Note: Local Government Act 1958 (No. 6299)) the Country Roads Act 1958 (Note: Country Roads Act 1958 (No. 6229)) and the Lower Yarra Crossing Authority Act 1965 (Note: Lower Yarra Crossing Authority Act 1965 (No. 7365)) and for other purposes. (Repealed by Statute Law Revision Act 1995 (No. 11 of 1995))
Superannuation Act 1975	No. 8717	16 May 1975
An Act to establish a Revised Scheme of Superannuation to make special provision with respect to Female Officers and Railway Service Employés, to amend the Superannuation Act 1958 (Note: Superannuation Act 1958 (No. 6386)) and the Married Women's Superannuation Act 1968 (Note: Married Women's Superannuation Fund Act 1968 (No. 7776)) and for other purposes.
Margarine Act 1975	No. 8720	16 May 1975
An Act to amend and consolidate the Law relating to the Manufacture Packing and Sale of Margarine.
State Insurance Office Act 1975	No. 8727	16 May 1975
An Act to establish a State Insurance Office under the Management and Control of the Insurance Commissioner, to incorporate the Insurance Commissioner, to provide for the Classes of Business to be undertaken by the State Insurance Office, for taking over the Business of the State Accident Insurance Office and the State Motor Car Insurance Office, and for the Establishment of an Investment Advisory Committee.
Water Resources Act 1975 (repealed)	No. 8729	16 May 1975
An Act to establish a Ministry of Water Resources and Water Supply for the purpose of ensuring the most efficient Utilization of the Water Resources of Victoria and for other purposes. (Repealed by Water (Central Management Restructuring) Act 1984 (No. 10081))
Parliamentary Officers Act 1975 (repealed)	No. 8730	16 May 1975
An Act to re-enact with Amendments the Law relating to the Officers of the Parliament of Victoria and for other purposes. (Repealed by Parliamentary Administration Act 2005 (No. 20 of 2005)
Magistrates (Summary Proceedings) Act 1975 (repealed)	No. 8731	16 May 1975
An Act to re-enact with Amendments the Law relating to the Procedure and Practice of Magistrates' Courts with respect to the Summary Determination of Matters, the Practice of Justices with respect to the Taking of Informations and Complaints and the Issue of Warrants and Summonses thereon, the Preliminary Examination of Persons charged with Indictable Offences, and for Purposes connected therewith. (Repealed by Magistrates' Court Act 1989 (No. 51 of 1989))
Eltham Land Act 1975	No. 8735	21 October 1975
An Act relating to certain Crown land in the Township of Eltham.
Harbors and Navigable Waters Protection Act 1975 or the Harbours and Navigable Waters Protection Act 1975	No. 8749	5 November 1975
An Act to amend the Melbourne Harbor Trust Act 1958, (Note: Melbourne Harbor Trust Act 1958 (No. 6312)) the Geelong Harbor Trust Act 1958, (Note: Geelong Harbor Trust Act 1958 (No. 6262)) the Harbor Boards Act 1958 (Note: Harbor Boards Act 1958 (No. 6268)) and the Marine Act 1958 (Note: Marine Act 1958 (No. 6302)) in relation to the Protection of Harbors and Navigable Waters from Damage, and for other purposes.
Constitution Act 1975	No. 8750	19 November 1975 (Note: This act was reserved for approval by Her Majesty.)
An Act to re-enact the Law relating to the Constitution of the State of Victoria and for other purposes.
Courts Administration Act 1975	No. 8752	18 November 1975
An Act to establish the office of Director of Court Administration and to make provision for the more efficient disposal of business dealt with by the Courts of Victoria, and for other purposes.
Coal Creek Historical Park Act 1975 (repealed)	No. 8757	18 November 1975
An Act to make Provision for the Establishment of a Coal Creek Historical Park Authority for developing and fostering Coal Creek Historical Park and for Purposes connected therewith. (Repealed by Swan Hill Pioneer Settlement Authority (Repeal) Act 1994 (No. 46 of 1994))
Bendigo (Dai Gum San Village) Land Act 1975 (repealed)	No. 8762	18 November 1975
An Act to permanently reserve certain Land in the Parish of Sandhurst for Recreation and Public Purposes and to authorize the Granting of Leases of the Whole or any Part of such Land to The Bendigo Trust and for other Purposes. (Repealed by Land (Further Revocation of Reservations) Act 1998 (No. 68 of 1998))
Horse Breeding (Repeal) Act 1975 (repealed)	No. 8773	25 November 1975
An Act to repeal the Horse Breeding Act 1958 (Note: Horse Breeding Act 1958 (No. 6272)) and for other purposes. (Repealed by Statute Law (Further Revision) Act 2006 (No. 29 of 2006))
Appropriation (1975-76, No. 1) Act 1975	No. 8780	25 November 1975
An Act to appropriate certain Sums out of the Consolidated Fund for the Service of the Financial Year 1975-76 and to appropriate the Supplies granted in this Session of Parliament and for other purposes.
Zoological Gardens (Amendment) Act 1975	No. 8782	2 December 1975
An Act to make provision with respect to Zoological Parks, to amend the Zoological Gardens Act 1967, (Note: Zoological Gardens Act 1967 (No. 7518)) to amend the Ministry for Conservation Act 1972 (Note: Ministry for Conservation Act 1972 (No. 8364)) and for other purposes.
Securities Industry Act 1975	No. 8788	2 December 1975
An Act to consolidate and amend the law with respect to the regulation and control of trading in securities, the licensing of persons dealing in securities, the establishment and administration by stock exchanges of fidelity funds and for other purposes.
State Co-ordination Council Act 1975	No. 8793	2 December 1975
An Act to establish a State Co-ordination Council, to make provision with respect to the Implementation of Policies of the Government, to amend the Town and Country Planning Act 1961 and for other purposes.
State Electricity Commission (Amendment) Act 1975	No. 8797	2 December 1975
An Act to amend the State Electricity Commission Act 1958 (Note: State Electricity Commission Act 1958 (No. 6377)) and the Electric Light and Power Act 1958 (Note: Electric Light and Power Act 1958 (No. 6241)) and for other purposes.
Railways (Amendment) Act 1975	No. 8801	2 December 1975
An Act to amend the Railways Act 1958 (Note: Railways Act 1958 (No. 6355)) and for other purposes.
Scaffolding (Amendment) Act 1975 (repealed)	No. 8802	2 December 1975
An Act to amend the Scaffolding Act 1971 (Note: Scaffolding Act 1971 (No. 8146)) and for other purposes. (Repealed by Statute Law Revision Act 1984 (No. 10087))
State Electricity Commission (Tramways) Act 1975 (repealed)	No. 8807	2 December 1975
An Act to ratify the Making by the State Electricity Commission of Victoria of certain Payments in connexion with the Abandonment of Tramway Undertakings at Ballarat and Bendigo and to repeal Part VI. of the State Electricity Commission Act 1958. (Repealed by Treasury Legislation (Repeal) Act 2005 (No. 73 of 2005))
Drainage of Land Act 1975 (repealed)	No. 8811	9 December 1981
An Act to make provision concerning the Drainage of Land, to repeal the Drainage of Land Act 1958, (Note: Drainage of Land Act 1958 (No. 6238)) to amend certain other Acts, and for other purposes. (Repealed by Water Act 1989 (No. 80 of 1989))
Social Welfare (Amendment) Act 1975	No. 8821	9 December 1975
An Act to amend the Social Welfare Act 1970 and for other purposes.
Water Supply Works and Services Act 1975 (repealed)	No. 8825	9 December 1975
An Act to authorize Expenditure on Works and Services and other Purposes relating to Irrigation Water Supply Drainage Sewerage Flood Protection and River Improvement, and other purposes. (Repealed by Treasury Legislation (Repeal) Act 2005 (No. 73 of 2005))
Agricultural Colleges (Amendment) Act 1975	No.	
Broiler Chicken Industry Act 1975	No.	
Building Societies (Special Advances) Act 1975	No.	
Business Franchise (Tobacco) Act 1975	No.	
Carlton (Recreation Ground) Land Act 1975	No.	
Cattle Compensation (Amendment) Act 1975	No.	
Co-operative Housing Societies (Amendment) Act 1975	No.	
Coal Mines (Pensions Increase) Act 1975	No.	
Companies Act 1975	No.	
Consumer Affairs (Amendment) Act 1975	No.	
Country Fire Authority (Constitution) Act 1975	No.	
Crimes (Capital Offences) Act 1975	No.	
Dandenong Valley Authority (Amendment) Act 1975	No.	
Decentralized Industry Incentive Payments (Amendment) Act 1975	No.	
Dental Technicians (Amendment) Act 1975	No.	
Dog (Amendment) Act 1975	No.	
Education (Administration) Act 1975	No.	
Education (School Councils) Act 1975	No.	
Education (Volunteer Workers Compensation) Act 1975	No.	
Education (Work Experience) (Amendment) Act 1975	No.	
Educational Grants (Continuation) Act 1975	No.	
Environment Protection (Noise Control) Act 1975	No.	
Fisheries Act 1975	No.	
Forests (Softwood Holdings Agreement) Act 1975	No.	
Frankston Land Act 1975	No.	
Gas and Fuel Corporation Act 1975	No.	
Geelong Harbor Trust Lands Act 1975	No.	
Geelong Regional Authority Act 1975	No.	
Geelong Waterworks and Sewerage (Powers) Act 1975	No.	
Grain Elevators (Amendment) Act 1975	No.	
Hairdressers Registration (Amendment) Act 1975	No.	
Health (Fees) Act 1975	No.	
Health (Proprietary Medicines Advisory Committee) Act 1975	No.	
Home Finance (Amendment) Act 1975	No.	
Housing (Movable Units) Act 1975	No.	
Inflammable Liquids (Amendment) Act 1975	No.	
Judges Salaries and Allowances Act 1975	No.	
Juries (Amendment) Act 1975	No.	
La Trobe University (Amendment) Act 1975	No.	
Labour and Industry (Industrial Appeals Court) Act 1975	No.	
Labour and Industry (Wages Board Determinations) Act 1975	No.	
Land Act 1975	No.	
Land Settlement (Amendment) Act 1975	No.	
Land Tax Act 1975	No.	
Latrobe Valley (Amendment) Act 1975	No.	
Legal Profession Practice Act 1975	No.	
Lifts and Cranes (Amendment) Act 1975	No.	
Liquor Control (Amendment) Act 1975	No.	
Liquor Control (Chairmen) Act 1975	No.	
Local Authorities Superannuation (Pensions) Act 1975	No.	
Local Government (Amendment) Act 1975	No.	
Local Government (City of Ringwood) Act 1975	No.	
Lotteries Gaming and Betting (Amendment) Act 1975	No.	
Magistrates' Courts (Amendment) Act 1975	No.	
Marine (Amendment) Act 1975	No.	
Marine (Further Amendment) Act 1975	No.	
Medical Practitioners (Fees) Act 1975	No.	
Melbourne Cricket Ground (Amendment) Act 1975	No.	
Melbourne Harbor Trust (Long Service Leave) (Amendment) Act 1975	No.	
Melbourne Underground Rail Loop (Amendment) Act 1975	No.	
Metropolitan Fire Brigades (Borrowing Powers) Act 1975	No.	
Metropolitan Fire Brigades (Long Service Leave) Act 1975	No.	
Milk and Dairy Supervision (Amendment) Act 1975	No.	
Mines (Amendment) Act 1975	No.	
Motor Accidents Act 1975	No.	
Motor Car (Child Seat Restraints) Act 1975	No.	
Motor Car (Penalties) Act 1975	No.	
Navigable Waters (Oil Pollution) (Amendment) Act 1975	No.	
Northcote Trust Fund Act 1975	No.	
Nurses (Amendment) Act 1975	No.	
Optometrists Act 1975	No.	
Parliamentary Salaries and Superannuation (Amendment) Act 1975	No.	
Parliamentary Salaries and Superannuation Act 1975	No.	
Patriotic Funds (Amendment) Act 1975	No.	
Pay-roll Tax Act 1975	No.	
Pensioners' Rates Remission Act 1975	No.	
Pensioners' Water and Sewerage Rates Remission Act 1975	No.	
Police Regulation (Amendment) Act 1975	No.	
Police Regulation (Long Service Leave) Act 1975	No.	
Police Regulation (Pensions) Act 1975	No.	
Ports and Harbors (Penalties) Act 1975	No.	
Ports and Harbors Act 1975	No.	
Public Service (Transitional Provisions) Act 1975	No.	
Public Service Act 1975	No.	
Public Works and Services Act 1975	No.	
Racing (Mid-week Racing) Act 1975	No.	
Racing (Totalizator Commissions) Act 1975	No.	
Racing Act 1975	No.	
Railways (Participation in Pipeline Operations) Act 1975	No.	
Revocation and Excision of Crown Reservations Act 1975	No.	
Road Traffic (Amendment) Act 1975	No.	
Rural Finance (Amendment) Act 1975	No.	
Small Claims Tribunals (Amendment) Act 1975	No.	
South Melbourne Land Act 1975	No.	
Stamps Act 1975	No.	
State College of Victoria (Borrowing Powers) Act 1975	No.	
State Development (Amendment) Act 1975	No.	
State Forests Works and Services Act 1975	No.	
Stock (Artificial Breeding) (Amendment) Act 1975	No.	
Stock Diseases (Amendment) Act 1975	No.	
Stock Diseases (Further Amendment) Act 1975	No.	
Stock Foods (Amendment) Act 1975	No.	
Stock Medicines (Amendment) Act 1975	No.	
Superannuation (Amendment) Act 1975	No.	
Supply (1975-76, No. 1) Act 1975	No.	
Teaching Service (Amendment) Act 1975	No.	
Teaching Service (Assistant Professional Appointees) Act 1975	No.	
Teaching Service (Special Duties Allowances) Act 1975	No.	
Constitution Act Amendment (Conjoint Elections) Act 1975	No.	
Thornbury Lands Act 1975	No.	
Tomato Processing Industry (Uniform Agreement) (Amendment) Act 1975	No.	
Town and Country Planning (Amendment) Act 1975	No.	
Town and Country Planning (Further Amendment) Act 1975	No.	
Transport Regulation (Licence Fees) Act 1975	No.	
Transport Regulation (Private Omnibuses) Act 1975	No.	
Transport Works and Services Act 1975	No.	
Trustee Companies (Commission) Act 1975	No.	
Valuation of Land (Amendment) Act 1975	No.	
Veterinary Surgeons (Amendment) Act 1975	No.	
Victoria Institute of Colleges (Amendment) Act 1975	No.	
Water (Amendment) Act 1975	No.	
Water Resources (Amendment) Act 1975	No.	
West Moorabool Water Board (Amendment) Act 1975	No.	
William E. Dorling Scholarship Fund Act 1975	No.	
Wodonga Area Land Acquisition (Amendment) Act 1975	No.	
Workers Compensation (Amendment) Act 1975	No.	
Workers Compensation (Surcharge Payments) Act 1975	No.	

== Sources ==
- "1975 Victorian Historical Acts". AustLII.
