= List of acts of the Parliament of Victoria from 1981 =

This is a list of acts of the Parliament of Victoria, Australia for the year 1981.

== 1981 ==
Short title, or popular name	Citation	Royal assent
Long title
Sewerage Districts (Amendment) Act 1981	No. 9515	24 March 1981
An Act to amend the Sewerage Districts Act 1958 (Note: Sewerage Districts Act 1958 (No. 6368)) and for other purposes.
Dandenong Valley Authority (Amendment) Act 1981	No. 9516	24 March 1981
An Act to amend Section 13 of the Dandenong Valley Authority Act 1963 (Note: Dandenong Valley Authority Act 1963 (No. 7060)) and for other purposes.
Latrobe Valley (Amendment) Act 1981	No. 9517	24 March 1981
An Act to amend the Latrobe Valley Act 1958. (Note: Latrobe Valley Act 1958 (No. 6290))
Fisheries (Commonwealth-State Arrangements) Act 1981 (repealed)	No. 9518	24 March 1981
An Act to amend the Fisheries Act 1968 (Note: Fisheries Act 1968 (No. 7780)) to enable Arrangements with respect to the Management of certain Fisheries to be entered into between, and given Effect to by the Commonwealth and the State. (Repealed by Statute Law Revision Act 1995 (No. 11 of 1995))
Summary Offences (Corporation Meetings) Act 1981 (repealed)	No. 9519	24 March 1981
An Act to make Provision with respect to the Preservation of Order at meetings of Corporations and to amend section 17 of the Summary Offences Act 1966. (Note: Summary Offences Act 1966 (No. 7405)) (Repealed by Statute Law Revision Act 1995 (No. 11 of 1995))
Magistrates (Summary Proceedings) Act 1981 (repealed)	No. 9520	24 March 1981
An Act to amend the Magistrates (Summary Proceedings) Act 1975. (Note: Magistrates (Summary Proceedings) Act 1975 (No. 8731)) (Repealed by Statute Law Revision Act 1995 (No. 11 of 1995))
Police Offences (Restricted Publications) Act 1981 (repealed)	No. 9521	24 March 1981
An Act to amend the Police Offences Act 1958 (Note: Police Offences Act 1958 (No. 6337)) with respect to restricted publications, and for other purposes. (Repealed by Statute Law Revision Act 1995 (No. 11 of 1995))
Business Names (Amendment) Act 1981 (repealed)	No. 9522	31 March 1981
An Act to amend the Business Names Act 1962 (Note: Business Names Act 1962 (No. 6853)) and for other purposes. (Repealed by Statute Law Revision Act 1995 (No. 11 of 1995))
Melbourne Underground Rail Loop (Amendment) Act 1981 (repealed)	No. 9523	7 April 1981
An Act to enable the Melbourne Underground Rail Loop Authority to purchase or, with the consent of the Minister, acquire certain lands in the City of Melbourne, to amend the Melbourne Underground Rail Loop Act 1970 (Note: Melbourne Underground Rail Loop Act 1970 (No. 8023)) and for other purposes. (Repealed by Transport Act 1983 (No. 9921))
Industrial Relations Act 1981 (repealed)	No. 9524	7 April 1981
An Act to amend the Industrial Relations Act 1979 (Note: Industrial Relations Act 1979 (No. 9365)) and the Second Schedule to the Superannuation Act 1958. (Note: Superannuation Act 1958 (No. 6386)) (Repealed by Statute Law Revision Act 1995 (No. 11 of 1995))
Local Government (City of Melbourne) Act 1981	No. 9525	23 April 1981
An Act to authorize the Appointment of Commissioners to administer the City of Melbourne for a Limited Period, to remove the Council of that City from Office and for other purposes.
Flemington Land Act 1981	No. 9526	23 April 1981
An Act relating to certain Crown Land in the Parish of Doutta Galla.
Police Regulation (Appointments) Act 1981 (repealed)	No. 9527	23 April 1981
An Act to amend Part I. of the Police Regulation Act 1958. (Note: Police Regulation Act 1958 (No. 6338)) (Repealed by Statute Law Revision Act 1995 (No. 11 of 1995))
Land (Amendment) Act 1981 (repealed)	No. 9528	23 April 1981
An Act to amend the Land Act 1958, (Note: Land Act 1958 (No. 6284)) to make Provision for the payment of Allowances and Travelling Expenses to certain Members of Local Land Advisory Committees to make Provision for certain Certificates of the Secretary for Lands to be admissible in Evidence, to provide for the Surrender of certain Lands, and for other purposes. (Repealed by Statute Law Revision Act 1995 (No. 11 of 1995))
Liquified Petroleum Gas Subsidy (Amendment) Act 1981 (repealed)	No. 9529	23 April 1981
An Act to amend the Liquified Petroleum Gas Subsidy Act 1980. (Note: Liquified Petroleum Gas Subsidy Act 1980 (No. 9414)) (Repealed by Statute Law Revision Act 1995 (No. 11 of 1995))
Revocation and Excision of Crown Reservations Act 1981	No. 9530	23 April 1981
An Act to revoke the Permanent Reservations of certain Lands and for Purposes connected therewith.
State Electricity Commission (Amendment) Act 1981 (repealed)	No. 9531	24 April 1981
An Act to amend the State Electricity Commission Act 1958 (Note: State Electricity Commission Act 1958 (No. 6377)) and for other purposes. (Repealed by Statute Law Revision Act 1995 (No. 11 of 1995))
Chiropractors and Osteopaths (Registration) Act 1981 (repealed)	No. 9532	5 May 1981
An Act to amend section 8 of the Chiropractors and Osteopaths Act 1978 (Note: Chiropractors and Osteopaths Act 1978 (No. 9161)) with respect to the Registration of Persons practising Chiropractic and Osteopathy before 1 January 1979. (Repealed by Statute Law Revision Act 1995 (No. 11 of 1995))
Port of Melbourne Authority (Lands) Act 1981 (repealed)	No. 9533	5 May 1981
An Act to amend Part IV. of the Second Schedule to the Port of Melbourne Authority Act 1958. (Note: Melbourne Harbor Trust Act 1958 (No. 6312)) (Repealed by Statute Law Revision Act 1995 (No. 11 of 1995))
Rural Finance and Settlement Commission (Amendment) Act 1981 (repealed)	No. 9534	5 May 1981
An Act to amend Section 25 of the Rural Finance and Settlement Commission Act 1961 (Note: Rural Finance and Settlement Commission Act 1961 (No. 6846)) and for other purposes. (Repealed by Statute Law Revision Act 1995 (No. 11 of 1995))
Supply (1981-82, No. 1) Act 1981 (repealed)	No. 9535	5 May 1981
An Act to make Interim Provision for the Appropriation of Moneys out of the Consolidated Fund for the Service of the Financial Year 1981-82. (Repealed by Statute Law Revision Act 1995 (No. 11 of 1995))
Transport Regulation (Assignment of Licences) Act 1981 (repealed)	No. 9536	12 May 1981
An Act to amend the Transport Regulation Act 1958 (Note: Transport Regulation Act 1958 (No. 6400)) with respect to the Assignment of Rights under Licences issued under that Act and for other purposes. (Repealed by Transport Act 1983 (No. 9921))
Local Government (Land Liable to Flooding) Act 1981	No. 9537	12 May 1981
An Act to amend the Local Government Act 1958 (Note: Local Government Act 1958 (No. 6299)) and for other purposes.
Geelong Lands Act 1981	No. 9538	12 May 1981
An Act to revoke the Reservations of certain Lands at Geelong and for Purposes connected therewith.
Local Government (Shires of Melton and Bulla) Act 1981	No. 9539	12 May 1981
An Act to amend Part XLA. of the Local Government Act 1958.
Land Conservation (Amendment) Act 1981 (repealed)	No. 9540	12 May 1981
An Act to amend section 3 of the Land Conservation Act 1970 (Note: Land Conservation Act 1970 (No. 8008)) to make provision with respect to an additional Member of the Land Conservation Council. (Repealed by Statute Law Revision Act 1995 (No. 11 of 1995))
Stamps (Miscellaneous Amendment) Act 1981 (repealed)	No. 9541	12 May 1981
An Act to amend the Stamps Act 1958 (Note: Stamps Act 1958 (No. 6375)) and for other purposes. (Repealed by Statute Law Revision Act 1995 (No. 11 of 1995))
Adoption of Children (Information) (Amendment) Act 1981 (repealed)	No. 9542	12 May 1981
An Act to amend the Adoption of Children (Information) Act 1980 (Note: Adoption of Children (Information) Act 1980 (No. 9510)) and for other purposes. (Repealed by Statute Law Revision Act 1995 (No. 11 of 1995))
Railways (Long Service Leave) Act 1981 (repealed)	No. 9543	11 May 1981
An Act to amend Section 187 of the Railways Act 1958. (Note: Railways Act 1958 (No. 6355)) (Repealed by Transport Act 1983 (No. 9921))
Local Government (House Builders' Liability Amendment) Act 1981	No. 9544	12 May 1981
An Act to amend Division lA of Part XLIX. of the Local Government Act 1958.
Building Societies (Amendment) Act 1981 (repealed)	No. 9545	12 May 1981
An Act to amend the Building Societies Act 1976. (Note: Building Societies Act 1976 (No. 8966)) (Repealed by Statute Law Revision Act 1995 (No. 11 of 1995))
Rural Finance (Amendment) Act 1981 (repealed)	No. 9546	12 May 1981
An Act to amend the Rural Finance Act 1958 (Note: Rural Finance Corporation Act 1958 (No. 6360)) and for other purposes. (Repealed by Statute Law Revision Act 1995 (No. 11 of 1995))
Hospitals and Charities (Amendment) Act 1981 (repealed)	No. 9547	12 May 1981
An Act to amend the Hospitals and Charities Act 1958, (Note: Hospitals and Charities Act 1958 (No. 6274)) to make further provision with respect to the Relief of aged, disabled or handicapped Persons, to enable Scheduled Hospitals to enter into Agreements with Benevolent Societies and Institutions with respect to the Transfer of Assets, the Use of Property and the Provision of Services and for other purposes. (Repealed by Statute Law Revision Act 1995 (No. 11 of 1995))
Motor Car (Mass and Dimension Limits) Act 1981 (repealed)	No. 9548	19 May 1981
An Act to amend the Motor Car Act 1958 (Note: Motor Car Act 1958 (No. 6325)) with respect to the Mass and Dimension Limits of Motor Cars, to amend the Stamps Act 1958 and for purposes connected therewith. (Repealed by Statute Law Revision (Repeals) Act 1999 (No. 3 of 1999))
Statute Law Revision Act 1981 (repealed)	No. 9549	19 May 1981
An Act to revise the Statute Law. (Repealed by Statute Law Revision Act 1995 (No. 11 of 1995))
Government Employee Housing Authority Act 1981	No. 9550	19 May 1981
An Act to establish a Government Employee Housing Authority, to make provision with respect to Housing Accommodation for Government Employees, to repeal the Teacher Housing Act 1970, (Note: Teacher Housing Act 1970 (No. 8062)) to amend certain other enactments, and Tor other purposes.
Crown Land (Reserves) (Amendment) Act 1981 (repealed)	No. 9551	19 May 1981
An Act to amend the Crown Land {Reserves) Act 1978. (Note: Crown Land (Reserves) Act 1978 (No. 9212)) (Repealed by Statute Law Revision Act 1995 (No. 11 of 1995))
Urban Renewal (Amendment) Act 1981 (repealed)	No. 9552	19 May 1981
An Act to amend the Urban Renewal Act 1970, (Note: Urban Renewal Act 1970 (No. 8052)) the Housing Act 1958 (Note: Housing Act 1958 (No. 6275)) and the Local Government Act 1958. (Repealed by Statute Law Revision Act 1995 (No. 11 of 1995))
Housing (Amendment) Act 1981	No. 9553	19 May 1981
An Act to amend the Housing Act 1958 and for other purposes.
Penalties and Sentences Act 1981 (repealed)	No. 9554	19 May 1981
An Act to consolidate and amend the Law relating to Penalties and Sentences, to amend the Crimes Act 1958, (Note: Crimes Act 1958 (No. 6231)) the Magistrates (Summary Proceedings) Act 1975 and the Community Welfare Services Act 1970 (Note: Social Welfare Act 1970 (No. 8089)) and for other purposes. (Repealed by Penalties and Sentences Act 1985 (No. 10260))
Port Bellarine Tourist Resort Act 1981	No. 9555	19 May 1981
An Act to ratify validate approve and otherwise give effect to an Agreement between the Premier for and on behalf of the State of Victoria and Grawin Proprietary Limited with respect to the Development of Land near Portarlington in the State of Victoria for the purpose of the Establishment of a Tourist Resort, to provide for the Rezoning of the Land in the Tourist Resort Area, to establish a Committee of Management of Crown Lands in the Tourist Resort Area and for other purposes.
Firearms (Shooters' Licences) Act 1981 (repealed)	No. 9556	19 May 1981
An Act to amend Part III. and Part IV. of the Firearms Act 1958. (Note: Firearms Act 1958 (No. 6251)) (Repealed by Statute Law Revision Act 1995 (No. 11 of 1995))
Motor Boating (Amendment) Act 1981 (repealed)	No. 9557	19 May 1981
An Act to amend the Motor Boating Act 1961. (Note: Motor Boating Act 1961 (No. 6832)) (Repealed by Statute Law Revision Act 1995 (No. 11 of 1995))
Melbourne and Metropolitan Board of Works (Amendment) Act 1981	No. 9558	19 May 1981
An Act to amend the Melbourne and Metropolitan Board of Works Act 1958 (Note: Melbourne and Metropolitan Board of Works Act 1958 (No. 6310)) and for other purposes.
Melbourne Underground Rail Loop (Borrowing Powers) Act 1981 (repealed)	No. 9559	19 May 1981
An Act to increase the Borrowing Powers of the Melbourne Underground Rail Loop Authority. (Repealed by Transport Act 1983 (No. 9921))
Motor Car (Pensioner Concessions) Act 1981 (repealed)	No. 9560	19 May 1981
An Act to amend the Motor Car Act 1958. (Repealed by Statute Law Revision Act 1995 (No. 11 of 1995))
Labour and Industry (Amendment) Act 1981 (repealed)	No. 9561	19 May 1981
An Act to amend the Labour and Industry Act 1958. (Note: Labour and Industry Act 1958 (No. 6283)) (Repealed by Statute Law Revision Act 1995 (No. 11 of 1995))
Securities Industry (Application of Laws) Act 1981	No. 9562	19 May 1981
An Act relating to the Securities Industry in Victoria.
Companies and Securities (Interpretation and Miscellaneous Provisions) (Application of Laws) Act 1981	No. 9563	19 May 1981
An Act relating to the Interpretation of certain Provisions relating to Corporations and the Securities Industry and for certain other matters.
Companies (Acquisition of Shares) (Application of Laws) Act 1981	No. 9564	19 May 1981
An Act relating to the Application of Laws to regulate the Acquisition of Shares in Companies incorporated in Victoria and Matters connected therewith, to amend the Companies Act 1961 (Note: Companies Act 1961 (No. 6839)) and for other purposes.
Industrial Training (Amendment) Act 1981 (repealed)	No. 9565	19 May 1981
An Act to amend the Industrial Training Act 1975 (Note: Industrial Training Act 1975 (No. 8706)) and for other purposes. (Repealed by Statute Law Revision Act 1995 (No. 11 of 1995))
Victorian College of the Arts Act 1981	No. 9566	19 May 1981
An Act to provide for the reconstitution of the Victorian College of the Arts and for other purposes.
Economic Development Act 1981	No. 9567	19 May 1981
An Act with respect to the Economic Development of Victoria, to amend the Decentralized Industry Incentive Payments Act 1972 (Note: Decentralized Industry Incentive Payments Act 1972 (No. 8383)) and for other purposes.
Health (Exemptions) Act 1981 (repealed)	No. 9568	19 May 1981
An Act to amend the Health Act 1958 (Note: Health Act 1958 (No. 6270)) and for other purposes. (Repealed by Statute Law Revision Act 1995 (No. 11 of 1995))
Wills Act 1981 (repealed)	No. 9569	19 May 1981
An Act to make further provision with respect to the Construction of Wills, to amend the Wills Act 1958, (Note: Wills Act 1958 (No. 6416)) and for other purposes. (Repealed by Statute Law Revision Act 1995 (No. 11 of 1995))
National Parks (Amendment) Act 1981	No. 9570	19 May 1981
An Act to create new National Parks, to amend the National Parks Act 1975 (Note: National Parks Act 1975 (No. 8702)) and the Mt. Hotham Alpine Resort Act 1972 (Note: Mt. Hotham Alpine Resort Act 1972 (No. 8260)) and for other purposes.
Environment Protection (Clean Air) Act 1981 (repealed)	No. 9571	19 May 1981
An Act to amend the Environment Protection Act 1970, (Note: Environment Protection Act 1970 (No. 8056)) to repeal the Clean Air Act 1958 (Note: Clean Air Act 1958 (No. 6220)) and for other purposes. (Repealed by Statute Law Revision Act 1995 (No. 11 of 1995))
National Companies and Securities Commission (State Provisions) Act 1981	No. 9572	19 May 1981
An Act to make Provision for the Operation of the National Companies and Securities Commission in the State.
Water Drainage Act 1981	No. 9573	19 May 1981
An Act to amend the Water Act 1958, (Note: Water Act 1958 (No. 6413)) the Local Government Act 1958, the Drainage of Land Act 1975, (Note: Drainage of Land Act 1975 (No. 8811)) the Dandenong Valley Authority Act 1963, the Melbourne and Metropolitan Board of Works Act 1958, and for other purposes.
Victorian Economic Development Corporation Act 1981	No. 9574	26 May 1981
An Act to constitute a Victorian Economic Development Corporation, to repeal the Victorian Development Corporation Act 1973 (Note: Victorian Development Corporation Act 1973 (No. 8428)) and the State Development Decentralization and Tourism Act 1978 (Note: State Development Decentralization and Tourism Act 1978 (No. 9126)) and for other purposes.
Local Government (Further Amendment) Act 1981	No. 9575	26 May 1981
An Act to amend the Local Government Act 1958 and for other purposes.
Crimes (Classification of Offences) Act 1981 (repealed)	No. 9576	26 May 1981
An Act to abolish the Division of Crimes into Felonies and Misdemeanours, to amend and simplify the Law in respect of Matters arising from that Abolition, to amend the Crimes Act 1958 and certain other Enactments, and for other purposes. (Repealed by Statute Law Revision Act 2013 (No. 70 of 2013)
Royal Visit Race-meeting Act 1981 (repealed)	No. 9577	29 September 1981
An Act to authorize the Holding of a Race-meeting, in honour of the Visit to Melbourne of Her Majesty the Queen, at the Caulfield Race-course on 29 September 1981, and for other purposes. (Repealed by Statute Law Revision Act 1995 (No. 11 of 1995))
Wildlife (Licences) Act 1981 (repealed)	No. 9578	29 September 1981
An Act to amend the Wildlife Act 1975 (Note: Wildlife Act 1975 (No. 8699)) in relation to Licence Fees for keeping Endangered or Notable Wildlife, and for other purposes. (Repealed by Statute Law Revision Act 1995 (No. 11 of 1995))
Port Fairy Land Act 1981	No. 9579	29 September 1981
An Act to authorize the Granting of Leases of certain Crown Land in the Township of Port Fairy.
Government Buildings Advisory Council (Amendment) Act 1981 (repealed)	No. 9580	20 October 1981
An Act to amend the Government Buildings Advisory Council Act 1972 (Note: Government Buildings Advisory Council Act 1972 (No. 8265)) and for other purposes. (Repealed by Historic Buildings (Amendment) Act 1983 (No. 9890))
Constitution Act Amendment (Conjoint Elections) Act 1981 (repealed)	No. 9581	20 October 1981
An Act to amend The Constitution Act Amendment Act 1958 (Note: Constitution Act Amendment Act 1958 (No. 6224)) with respect to the Holding and Conduct of Conjoint Elections. (Repealed by Statute Law Revision Act 1995 (No. 11 of 1995))
Education (Amendment) Act 1981 (repealed)	No. 9582	20 October 1981
An Act to amend the Education Act 1958 (Note: Education Act 1958 (No. 6240)) and for other purposes. (Repealed by Legislation Reform (Repeals No. 2) Act 2008 (No. 16 of 2008))
Labour and Industry (Further Amendment) Act 1981 (repealed)	No. 9583	27 October 1981
An Act to amend the Labour and Industry Act 1958, the Hospitals Remuneration Tribunal Act 1978, (Note: Hospitals Remuneration Tribunal Act 1978 (No. 9163)) the Health Commission Act 1977 (Note: Health Commission Act 1977 (No. 9023)) and for other purposes. (Repealed by Statute Law Revision Act 1995 (No. 11 of 1995))
Industrial Relations (Secret Ballots) Act 1981 (repealed)	No. 9584	27 October 1981
An Act to amend the Industrial Relations Act 1979 to make Provision for the Conduct of Secret Ballots with respect to Industrial Disputes. (Repealed by Statute Law Revision Act 1995 (No. 11 of 1995))
Films (Amendment) Act 1981 (repealed)	No. 9585	27 October 1981
An Act to amend the Films Act 1971. (Note: Films Act 1971 (No. 8161)) (Repealed by Statute Law Revision Act 1995 (No. 11 of 1995))
Country Fire Authority (Borrowing Powers) Act 1981 (repealed)	No. 9586	27 October 1981
An Act to amend the Country Fire Authority Act 1958 (Note: Country Fire Authority Act 1958 (No. 6228)) to increase the Borrowing Powers of the Country Fire Authority. (Repealed by Statute Law Revision Act 1995 (No. 11 of 1995))
French Island (Land Exchange) Act 1981	No. 9587	27 October 1981
An Act to provide for the Exchange of certain Crown Land in the Parish of French Island and certain other Land in that Parish and for other purposes.
Business Franchise (Petroleum Products) (Fees) Act 1981 (repealed)	No. 9588	30 October 1981
An Act to amend the Business Franchise (Petroleum Products) Act 1979 (Note: Business Franchise (Petroleum Products) Act 1979 (No. 9272)) to make provision with respect to Fees, and for other purposes. (Repealed by Statute Law Revision Act 1995 (No. 11 of 1995))
Footscray (Western Oval Reserve) Lands Act 1981	No. 9589	17 November 1981
An Act relating to the Granting of Leases of certain Lands in the City of Footscray and authorizing the Committee of Management of those Lands to extend the Leasing thereof, to amend the Footscray (Recreation Ground) Lands Act 1968 (Note: Footscray (Recreation Ground) Lands Act 1968 (No. 7704)) and for other purposes.
Transport (Fees) Act 1981 (repealed)	No. 9590	17 November 1981
An Act to amend the Transport Regulation Act 1958, the Country Roads Act 1958, (Note: Country Roads Act 1958 (No. 6229)) the Motor Car Act 1958 and the Local Government Act 1958, to make provision with respect to the collection of Fees by the Transport Regulation Board and for other purposes. (Repealed by Transport Act 1983 (No. 9921))
Geelong Regional Commission (Amendment) Act 1981 (repealed)	No. 9591	17 November 1981
An Act to amend the Geelong Regional Commission Act 1977. (Note: Geelong Regional Commission Act 1977 (No. 9024)) (Repealed by Statute Law Revision Act 1995 (No. 11 of 1995))
Port of Melbourne Authority (Inscribed Stock) Act 1981 (repealed)	No. 9592	1 November 1981
An Act to amend the Port of Melbourne Authority Act 1958 with respect to Inscribed Stock and for other purposes. (Repealed by Statute Law Revision Act 1995 (No. 11 of 1995))
Pipelines (Fees) Act 1981 (repealed)	No. 9593	17 November 1981
An Act with respect to Pipeline Operation Fees, to amend the Pipelines Act 1967 (Note: Pipelines Act 1967 (No. 7541)) and for other purposes. (Repealed by Statute Law Revision Act 1995 (No. 11 of 1995))
Public Authorities (Contributions) Act 1981 (repealed)	No. 9594	17 November 1981
An Act to amend the Public Authorities {Contributions) Act 1966 (Note: Public Authorities (Contributions) Act 1966 (No. 7441)) with respect to the Contributions to be made by the Gas and Fuel Corporation of Victoria. (Repealed by Statute Law Revision Act 1995 (No. 11 of 1995))
Council of Adult Education Act 1981	No. 9595	17 November 1981
An Act to establish a Body Corporate under the Name of the Council of Adult Education, to repeal Part V. of the Education Act 1958, and for other purposes.
Appropriation (1981-82, No. 1) Act 1981 (repealed)	No. 9596	24 November 1981
An Act to appropriate certain Sums out of the Consolidated Fund for the Service of the Financial Year 1981-82 and to appropriate the Supplies granted in the last preceding Session of Parliament and for other purposes. (Repealed by Statute Law Revision Act 1995 (No. 11 of 1995))
Exhibition (Amendment) Act 1981 (repealed)	No. 9597	24 November 1981
An Act to recognize the Bestowal of the Title "Royal" on the Exhibition, to amend the Exhibition Act 1957 (Note: Exhibition Act 1957 (No. 6120)) and for other purposes. (Repealed by Statute Law Revision Act 1995 (No. 11 of 1995))
Melbourne and Metropolitan Tramways (Borrowing Powers) Act 1981 (repealed)	No. 9598	24 November 1981
An Act to increase the limit of the Borrowing Powers of the Melbourne and Metropolitan Tramways Board. (Repealed by Transport Act 1983 (No. 9921))
Metropolitan Fire Brigades (Amendment) Act 1981 (repealed)	No. 9599	24 November 1981
An Act to amend the Metropolitan Fire Brigades Act 1958 (Note: Metropolitan Fire Brigades Act 1958 (No. 6315)) with respect to the Payment of Wages and Salaries and for other purposes. (Repealed by Statute Law Revision Act 1995 (No. 11 of 1995))
National Gallery of Victoria and the Victorian Arts Centre (Terms of Appointment of Members) Act 1981 (repealed)	No. 9600	24 November 1981
An Act to amend the National Gallery of Victoria Act 1966 (Note: National Gallery of Victoria Act 1966 (No. 7482)) and the Victorian Arts Centre Act 1979 (Note: Victorian Arts Centre Act 1979 (No. 9354)) to make provision with respect to the terms of appointment of members of the Council of Trustees of the National Gallery of Victoria and of members of the Victorian Arts Centre Trust, and for other purposes. (Repealed by Statute Law Revision Act 1995 (No. 11 of 1995))
Co-operative Housing Societies (Indemnities) Act 1981 (repealed)	No. 9601	24 November 1981
An Act to amend the Co-operative Housing Societies Act 1958 (Note: Co-operative Housing Societies Act 1958 (No. 6226)) in respect of Indemnities. (Repealed by Statute Law Revision Act 1995 (No. 11 of 1995))
Planning Appeals Board (Chief Chairman's Pension) Act 1981 (repealed)	No. 9602	24 November 1981
An Act to amend section 76 of the Planning Appeals Board Act 1980 (Note: Planning Appeals Board Act 1980 (No. 9512)) with respect to the retirement benefits payable to and in relation to the Chief Chairman of the Planning Appeals Board and for other purposes. (Repealed by Statute Law Revision Act 1995 (No. 11 of 1995))
Housing (Further Amendment) Act 1981	No. 9603	24 November 1981
An Act to amend the Housing Act 1958 to make provision for the Payment of Benefits to former Employés of Holmesglen Constructions and for other purposes.
Home Finance (Amendment) Act 1981	No. 9604	24 November 1981
An Act to amend the Home Finance Act 1962 (Note: Home Finance Act 1962 (No. 6933)) to make further Provision with respect to Loans on First Mortgage of Dwelling-houses made by the Home Finance Trust and for other purposes.
Urban Land Authority (Amendment) Act 1981 (repealed)	No. 9605	24 November 1981
An Act to amend section 19 of the Urban Land Authority Act 1979. (Note: Urban Land Authority Act 1979 (No. 9320)) (Repealed by Statute Law Revision Act 1995 (No. 11 of 1995))
Transport Regulation (Licence Fees Abolition) Act 1981 (repealed)	No. 9606	24 November 1981
An Act to amend the Transport Regulation Act 1958 to provide for the abolition of licence fees for the issue or renewal of Commercial Passenger Vehicle, Private Omnibus and Commercial Goods Vehicle Licences, to amend the Motor Car Act 1958 and the Transport (Deregulation) Act 1980 (Note: Transport (Deregulation) Act 1980 (No. 9511)) and for other purposes. (Repealed by Transport Act 1983 (No. 9921))
Swan Hill Pioneer Settlement (Amendment) Act 1981	No. 9607	24 November 1981
An Act to amend the Swan Hill Pioneer Settlement Act 1974. (Note: Swan Hill Pioneer Settlement Act 1974 (No. 8548))
Town and Country Planning (Western Port) Act 1981 (repealed)	No. 9608	24 November 1981
An Act to abolish the Western Port Regional Planning Authority, to transfer the Staff of that Authority into Public Service, to amend the Town and Country Planning Act 1961 (Note: Town and Country Planning Act 1961 (No. 6849)) and for other purposes. (Repealed by Statute Law Revision Act 1995 (No. 11 of 1995))
Tourist Railways Act 1981 (repealed)	No. 9609	1 December 1981
An Act to make Provision with respect to the Establishment, Management, and Operation of Tourist Railways and for other purposes. (Repealed by Transport Act 1983 (No. 9921))
Workers Compensation (Insurers Guarantee and Compensation Supplementation Fund) Act 1981 (repealed)	No. 9610	1 December 1981
An Act to make provision with respect to the application of any surplus in the Insurers Guarantee and Compensation Supplementation Fund, to amend the Workers Compensation Act 1958 (Note: Workers Compensation Act 1958 (No. 6419)) and other purposes. (Repealed by Statute Law Revision Act 1995 (No. 11 of 1995))
Victorian College of the Arts (Amendment) Act 1981 (repealed)	No. 9611	1 December 1981
An Act to amend Section 5 of the Victorian College of the Arts Act 1981. (Note: Victorian College of the Arts Act 1981 (No. 9566)) (Repealed by Statute Law Revision Act 1995 (No. 11 of 1995))
Stamps (Transfer Duty Refund) Act 1981 (repealed)	No. 9612	1 December 1981
An Act to amend the Stamps Act 1958 to make provision with respect to Refunds of Stamp Duty on Transfers or Conveyances and for other purposes. (Repealed by Statute Law Revision Act 1995 (No. 11 of 1995))
Workers Compensation (Amendment) Act 1981 (repealed)	No. 9613	1 December 1981
An Act to amend the Workers Compensation Act 1958 to amend the Workers Compensation (Amendment) Act 1978 (Note: Workers Compensation (Amendment) Act 1978 (No. 9136)) and for other purposes. (Repealed by Statute Law Revision Act 1995 (No. 11 of 1995))
Local Authorities Superannuation (Amendment) Act 1981	No. 9614	1 December 1981
An Act to amend the Local Authorities Superannuation Act 1958. (Note: Local Authorities Superannuation Act 1958 (No. 6298))
Forests (Amendment) Act 1981 (repealed)	No. 9615	1 December 1981
An Act to amend the Forests Act 1958. (Note: Forests Act 1958 (No. 6254)) (Repealed by Statute Law Revision Act 1995 (No. 11 of 1995))
Marine (Amendment) Act 1981 (repealed)	No. 9616	1 December 1981
An Act to amend the Marine Act 1958 (Note: Marine Act 1958 (No. 6302)) and for other purposes. (Repealed by Statute Law Revision (Repeals) Act 1999 (No. 3 of 1999))
Port of Melbourne Authority (Borrowing Powers) Act 1981 (repealed)	No. 9617	1 December 1981
An Act to increase the Borrowing Powers of the Port of Melbourne Authority and to amend the Port of Melbourne Authority Act 1958. (Repealed by Statute Law Revision Act 1995 (No. 11 of 1995))
Probate Duty Act 1981 (repealed)	No. 9618	1 December 1981
An Act to amend the Probate Duty Act 1962 (Note: Probate Duty Act 1962 (No. 6890)) and for other purposes. (Repealed by Statute Law Revision Act 1995 (No. 11 of 1995))
Melbourne University (Amendment) Act 1981 (repealed)	No. 9619	1 December 1981
An Act to amend the Melbourne University Act 1958 (Note: University Act 1958 (No. 6405)) and for other purposes. (Repealed by Statute Law Revision Act 1995 (No. 11 of 1995))
Juries (Amendment) Act 1981 (repealed)	No. 9620	1 December 1981
An Act to amend the Juries Act 1967 (Note: Juries Act 1967 (No. 7651)) and for other purposes. (Repealed by Statute Law Revision Act 1995 (No. 11 of 1995))
Foreign Judgments (Amendment) Act 1981 (repealed)	No. 9621	8 December 1981
An Act to make Provision for the Enforcement of certain Income Tax Judgments of Papua New Guinea, to amend the Foreign Judgments Act 1962 (Note: Foreign Judgments Act 1962 (No. 6916)) and for other purposes. (Repealed by Statute Law Revision Act 1995 (No. 11 of 1995))
Motor Car (Amendment) Act 1981 (repealed)	No. 9622	8 December 1981
An Act to amend the Motor Car Act 1958. (Repealed by Statute Law Revision Act 1995 (No. 11 of 1995))
Environment Protection (Licence Fees) Act 1981 (repealed)	No. 9623	8 December 1981
An Act to amend the Environment Protection Act 1970 to increase Licence Fees and for other purposes. (Repealed by Statute Law Revision Act 1995 (No. 11 of 1995))
Public Account (Investment Powers) Act 1981	No. 9624	8 December 1981
An Act to amend section 22B of the Public Account Act 1958. (Note: Public Account Act 1958 (No. 6345))
Public Trustee (Amendment) Act 1981	No. 9625	8 December 1981
An Act to amend the Public Trustee Act 1958 (Note: Public Trustee Act 1958 (No. 6350)) and the Public Service Act 1974 (Note: Public Service Act 1974 (No. 8658)) and for other purposes.
Gift Duty (Amendment) Act 1981 (repealed)	No. 9626	8 December 1981
An Act to amend the Gift Duty Act 1971 (Note: Gift Duty Act 1971 (No. 8176)) and for other purposes. (Repealed by Statute Law Revision Act 1995 (No. 11 of 1995))
Liquor Control (Amendment) Act 1981 (repealed)	No. 9627	8 December 1981
An Act to amend the Liquor Control Act 1968 (Note: Liquor Control Act 1968 (No. 7695)) and for other purposes. (Repealed by Statute Law Revision Act 1995 (No. 11 of 1995))
Motor Car (Mass and Dimension Limits) (Amendment) Act 1981 (repealed)	No. 9628	8 December 1981
An Act to amend the Motor Car (Mass and Dimension Limits) Act 1981. (Note: Motor Car (Mass and Dimension Limits) Act 1981 (No. 9548)) (Repealed by Statute Law Revision Act 1995 (No. 11 of 1995))
Country Fire Authority (Amendment) Act 1981 (repealed)	No. 9629	8 December 1981
An Act to amend the Country Fire Authority Act 1958 to establish an Appeal Tribunal and for other purposes. (Repealed by Statute Law Revision Act 1995 (No. 11 of 1995))
Property Law (Delivery by Agent) Act 1981 (repealed)	No. 9630	8 December 1981
An Act to amend the Property Law Act 1958 (Note: Property Law Act 1958 (No. 6344)) in relation to Delivery of Deeds by an Agent and for other purposes. (Repealed by Statute Law Revision Act 1995 (No. 11 of 1995))
Geelong Waterworks and Sewerage (Amendment) Act 1981	No. 9631	8 December 1981
An Act to amend the Geelong Waterworks and Sewerage Act 1958. (Note: Geelong Waterworks and Sewerage Act 1958 (No. 6263))
Supreme Court (Funds in Court) Act 1981 (repealed)	No. 9632	8 December 1981
An Act to amend section 189 of the Supreme Court Act 1958. (Note: Supreme Court Act 1958 (No. 6387)) (Repealed by Statute Law Revision Act 1995 (No. 11 of 1995))
Penalty Interest Rates Act 1981 (repealed)	No. 9633	8 December 1981
An Act to amend the Supreme Court Act 1958, the County Court Act 1958, (Note: County Court Act 1958 (No. 6230)) the Property Law Act 1958, the Transfer of Land Act 1958 (Note: Transfer of Land Act 1958 (No. 6399)) and the Magistrates' Courts Act 1971 (Note: Magistrates' Courts Act 1971 (No. 8184)) with respect to the Payment of Interest on certain Unpaid Moneys. (Repealed by Statute Law Revision Act 1995 (No. 11 of 1995))
Law Reform Act 1981 (repealed)	No. 9634	8 December 1981
An Act to make further Provision with respect to the Powers of the Law Reform Commissioner, to amend the Law Reform Act 1973 (Note: Law Reform Act 1973 (No. 8483)) and for other purposes. (Repealed by Law Reform Commission Act 1984 (No. 10131))
Port of Portland Authority Act 1981 (repealed)	No. 9635	8 December 1981
An Act to constitute the Portland Harbor Trust Commissioners into the Port of Portland Authority, to amend the Portland Harbor Trust Act 1958, (Note: Portland Harbor Trust Act 1958 (No. 6340)) the Grain Elevators Act 1958, (Note: Grain Elevators Act 1958 (No. 6266)) the Harbor Boards Act 1958, (Note: Harbor Boards Act 1958 (No. 6268)) the Marine Act 1958, the Public Contracts Act 1958, (Note: Public Contracts Act 1958 (No. 6347)) the Road Traffic Act 1958, (Note: Road Traffic Act 1958 (No. 6359)) the Navigable Waters (Oil Pollution) Act 1960, (Note: Navigable Waters (Oil Pollution) Act 1960 (No. 6705)) the Grain Handling Improvement Authorities Act 1979, (Note: Grain Handling Improvement Authorities Act 1979 (No. 9361)) the Alcoa (Portland Aluminium Smelter) Act 1980 (Note: Alcoa (Portland Aluminium Smelter) Act 1980 (No. 9434)) and for other purposes. (Repealed by Statute Law Revision Act 1995 (No. 11 of 1995))
Serpell Joint Schools Act 1981	No. 9636	15 December 1981
An Act to ratify validate approve and otherwise give effect to an Agreement between the Minister of Education for and on behalf of the State of Victoria, the Roman Catholic Trusts Corporation for the Diocese of Melbourne, the Mayor, Councillors and Citizens of the City of Doncaster and Templestowe and Serpell Community Project Proprietary Limited with respect to the Establishment Ownership and Operation of a building for the use of State School No. 5168 Serpell Primary School and of a Catholic Primary School at Templestowe Victoria and for other purposes.
Sale Station Relocation and Development Act 1981	No. 9637	15 December 1981
An Act to authorize the Relocation of the Sale Railway Station, the development of the said railway station land, and for other purposes.
Coroners (Amendment) Act 1981 (repealed)	No. 9638	15 December 1981
An Act to amend the Coroners Act 1958 (Note: Coroners Act 1958 (No. 6227)) with respect to the Making post-mortem Examinations, to amend the Registration of Births Deaths and Marriages Act 1959, (Note: Registration of Births Deaths and Marriages Act 1959 (No. 6564)) and for other purposes. (Repealed by Statute Law Revision Act 1995 (No. 11 of 1995))
Listing of Debtors Act 1981 (repealed)	No. 9639	15 December 1981
An Act to amend the County Court Act 1958, the Supreme Court Act 1958 and the Magistrates' Courts Act 1971 to restrict the Publication of Information with respect to Debtors. (Repealed by Statute Law Revision Act 1995 (No. 11 of 1995))
Magistrates (Summary Proceedings) (Traffic Courts) Act 1981 (repealed)	No. 9640	15 December 1981
An Act to amend the Magistrates (Summary Proceedings) Act 1975. (Repealed by Statute Law Revision Act 1995 (No. 11 of 1995))
Crown Reservations (Revocation and Excision) Act 1981	No. 9641	15 December 1981
An Act to revoke the Permanent Reservations and Crown Grants of certain Lands and for Purposes connected therewith.
Summary Offences (False Reports to Police) Act 1981 (repealed)	No. 9642	15 December 1981
An Act to amend Section 53 of the Summary Offences Act 1966. (Repealed by Statute Law Revision Act 1995 (No. 11 of 1995))
Wildlife (Fees) Act 1981 (repealed)	No. 9643	15 December 1981
An Act to amend the Wildlife Act 1975. (Repealed by Statute Law Revision Act 1995 (No. 11 of 1995))
Soil Conservation and Land Utilization (Amendment) Act 1981	No. 9644	15 December 1981
An Act to amend the Soil Conservation and Land Utilization Act 1958. (Note: Soil Conservation and Land Utilization Act 1958 (No. 6372))
Chelsea Lands Act 1981	No. 9645	15 December 1981
An Act to make provision with respect to certain Crown Grants of Lands in the Parish of Lyndhurst and for other purposes.
Police Regulation (Amendment) Act 1981 (repealed)	No. 9646	15 December 1981
An Act to amend the Police Regulation Act 1958 and for other purposes. (Repealed by Statute Law Revision Act 1995 (No. 11 of 1995))
Pay-roll Tax (Amendment) Act 1981 (repealed)	No. 9647	15 December 1981
An Act to amend the Pay-roll Tax Act 1971. (Note: Pay-roll Tax Act 1971 (No. 8154)) (Repealed by Statute Law Revision Act 1995 (No. 11 of 1995))
Land Tax (Amendment) Act 1981	No. 9648	15 December 1981
An Act to amend the Land Tax Act 1958. (Note: Land Tax Act 1958 (No. 6289))
Works and Services Appropriation Act 1981 (repealed)	No. 9649	15 December 1981
An Act with respect to the Appropriation of Moneys out of the Works and Services Account for certain Works and Purposes. (Repealed by Statute Law Revision (Repeals) Act 1999 (No. 3 of 1999))
Chattel Securities Act 1981 (repealed)	No. 9650	15 December 1981
An Act to make Provision relating to Chattel Securities and for that Purpose to amend the Instruments Act 1958, (Note: Instruments Act 1958 (No. 6279)) the Transport Regulation Act 1958 and the Motor Car Act 1958 and for other purposes. (Repealed by Chattel Securities Act 1987 (No. 15 of 1987))
Goods (Sales and Leases) Act 1981 (repealed)	No. 9651	15 December 1981
An Act relating to Conditions and Warranties in certain Sales and Leases, to amend the Goods Act 1958 (Note: Goods Act 1958 (No. 6265)) and for other purposes. (Repealed by Statute Law Revision Act 1995 (No. 11 of 1995))
Friendly Societies (Amendment) Act 1981 (repealed)	No. 9652	15 December 1981
An Act to amend the Friendly Societies Act 1958 (Note: Friendly Societies Act 1958 (No. 6255)) to increase the maximum payment which may be made pursuant to section 5 (3) and for other purposes. (Repealed by Statute Law Revision Act 1995 (No. 11 of 1995))
Trustee (Authorized Investments) Act 1981 (repealed)	No. 9653	15 December 1981
An Act to amend section 4 of the Trustee Act 1958 (Note: Trustee Act 1958 (No. 6401)) to authorize Trustees to deposit Moneys with certain Building Societies and for other purposes. (Repealed by Statute Law Revision Act 1995 (No. 11 of 1995))
Hospitals and Charities (Borrowing Powers) Act 1981 (repealed)	No. 9654	15 December 1981
An Act to amend the Hospitals and Charities Act 1958 with respect to the Borrowing Powers of certain institutions. (Repealed by Statute Law Revision Act 1995 (No. 11 of 1995))
Motor Car (Further Amendment) Act 1981 (repealed)	No. 9655	15 December 1981
An Act to further amend the Motor Car Act 1958 and for other purposes. (Repealed by Statute Law Revision Act 1995 (No. 11 of 1995))
Alcoholics and Drug-dependent Persons (Amendment) Act 1981 (repealed)	No. 9656	15 December 1981
An Act to amend the Alcoholics and Drug-dependent Persons Act 1968 (Note: Alcoholics and Drug-dependent Persons Act 1968 (No. 7772)) and for other purposes. (Repealed by Statute Law Revision Act 1995 (No. 11 of 1995))
State Employees Retirement Benefits (Amendment) Act 1981 (repealed)	No. 9657	15 December 1981
An Act to amend the State Employees Retirement Benefits Act 1979 (Note: State Employees Retirement Benefits Act 1979 (No. 9363)) and for other purposes. (Repealed by Statute Law Revision Act 1995 (No. 11 of 1995))
Port of Geelong Authority Act 1981 (repealed)	No. 9658	22 December 1981
An Act to constitute The Geelong Harbor Trust Commissioners into the Port of Geelong Authority, to amend the Geelong Harbor Trust Act 1958, (Note: Geelong Harbor Trust Act 1958 (No. 6262)) the Geelong Waterworks and Sewerage Act 1958, the Grain Elevators Act 1958, the Grain Handling Improvement Authorities Act 1979, the Local Government Act 1958, the Marine Act 1958, the Navigable Waters (Oil Pollution) Act 1960, the Port Phillip Authority Act 1966 (Note: Port Phillip Authority Act 1966 (No. 7498)) and the Road Traffic Act 1958 and for other purposes. (Repealed by Statute Law Revision Act 1995 (No. 11 of 1995))
Health (Consultative Council on Maternal and Perinatal Mortality and Morbidity) Act 1981 (repealed)	No. 9659	22 December 1981
An Act to amend the Health Act 1958 to establish a Consultative Council on Maternal and Perinatal Mortality and Morbidity and for other purposes. (Repealed by Statute Law Revision Act 1995 (No. 11 of 1995))
Cemeteries (Guarantees) Act 1981 (repealed)	No. 9660	22 December 1981
An Act to amend the Cemeteries Act 1958 (Note: Cemeteries Act 1958 (No. 6217)) and for other purposes. (Repealed by Statute Law Revision Act 1995 (No. 11 of 1995))
Educational Grants (Continuation) Act 1981 (repealed)	No. 9661	22 December 1981
An Act to amend the Educational Grants Act 1973. (Note: Educational Grants Act 1973 (No. 8495)) (Repealed by Statute Law Revision Act 1995 (No. 11 of 1995))
Stamps (Further Amendment) Act 1981 (repealed)	No. 9662	22 December 1981
An Act to amend the Stamps Act 1958 and for other purposes. (Repealed by Statute Law Revision Act 1995 (No. 11 of 1995))
Building Industry Long Service Leave (Amendment) Act 1981	No. 9663	22 December 1982
An Act to amend the Building Industry Long Service Leave Act 1975 (Note: Building Industry Long Service Leave Act 1975 (No. 8693)) and for other purposes.
Hospitals Superannuation (General Amendment) Act 1981	No. 9664	22 December 1981
An Act to amend the Hospitals Superannuation Act 1965 (Note: Hospitals Superannuation Act 1965 (No. 7354)) and the Hospitals Superannuation (Amendment) Act 1980 (Note: Hospitals Superannuation (Amendment) Act 1980 (No. 9397)) and for other purposes.
Railways (Borrowing Powers) Act 1981 (repealed)	No. 9665	22 December 1981
An Act to amend the Railways Act 1958 to enable the Victorian Railways Board to borrow moneys, to make a consequential amendment to the Public Account Act 1958 and for other purposes. (Repealed by Transport Act 1983 (No. 9921))
Meat Control Act 1981	No. 9666	22 December 1981
An Act to amend the Abattoir and Meat Inspection Act 1973 (Note: Abattoir and Meat Inspection Act 1973 (No. 8404)) and the Health Act 1958 and for other purposes.
Historic Buildings Act 1981	No. 9667	22 December 1981
An Act to consolidate and amend the law with respect to the Preservation of Buildings, Works and Objects of historic or architectural Importance, to amend the Town and Country Planning Act 1961 and the Local Government Act 1958, and for other purposes.
Credit Act 1981	No. 9668	22 December 1981
An Act relating to the provision of credit and the regulation of contracts providing credit and of matters connected with the provision of credit, to make provision for the licensing of certain persons and for other matters, to repeal the Money Lenders Act 1958, (Note: Money Lenders Act 1958 (No. 6324)) to amend the Hire-Purchase Act 1959, (Note: Hire-Purchase Act 1959 (No. 6531)) to amend certain other Acts and for other purposes.
Wrongs (Public Contracts) Act 1981	No. 9669	22 December 1981
An Act to enable the Recovery of Loss or Damage arising out of the Breach of certain Contracts and for other purposes.
Medical Practitioners (Amendment) Act 1981 (repealed)	No. 9670	22 December 1981
An Act to amend the Medical Practitioners Act 1970 (Note: Medical Practitioners Act 1970 (No. 8061)) and for other purposes. (Repealed by Statute Law Revision Act 1995 (No. 11 of 1995))
Racing (Amendment) Act 1981 (repealed)	No. 9671	22 December 1981
An Act to amend the Racing Act 1958 (Note: Racing Act 1958 (No. 6353)) and the Lotteries Gaming and Betting Act 1966, (Note: Lotteries Gaming and Betting Act 1966 (No. 7429)) in relation to Greyhound Racing and for other purposes. (Repealed by Statute Law Revision Act 1995 (No. 11 of 1995))
Superannuation (Lump Sum Benefits) Act 1981	No. 9672	22 December 1981
An Act to repeal the Married Women's Superannuation Fund Act 1968, (Note: Married Women's Superannuation Fund Act 1968 (No. 7776)) to amend the Superannuation Act 1958, the Police Regulation Act 1958, the Superannuation Benefits Act 1977, (Note: Superannuation Benefits Act 1977 (No. 9017)) the Superannuation Act 1975 (Note: Superannuation Act 1975 (No. 8717)) and the Pensions Supplementation Act 1966, (Note: Pensions Supplementation Act 1966 (No. 7417)) to make Provision for the Payment of Superannuation Benefits to Married Women and to Part-time Officers and Employés of the Public Service and for other purposes.
Victoria State Emergency Service Act 1981	No. 9673	23 December 1981
An Act to provide for the Constitution of a Victoria State Emergency Service, to prescribe the Functions thereof, to provide for the Payment of Compensation to Members thereof injured in the Performance of Activities as such and to certain other Persons, and for other purposes.
Business Franchise (Amendment) Act 1981 (repealed)	No. 9674	22 December 1981
An Act to amend the Business Franchise (Tobacco) Act 1974 (Note: Business Franchise (Tobacco) Act 1974 (No. 8597)) and the Business Franchise (Petroleum Products) Act 1979 and for other purposes. (Repealed by Statute Law Revision Act 1995 (No. 11 of 1995))
Motor Accidents (Amendment) Act 1981 (repealed)	No. 9675	22 December 1981
An Act to amend the Motor Accidents Act 1973 (Note: Motor Accidents Act 1973 (No. 8429)) and for other purposes. (Repealed by Statute Law Revision Act 1995 (No. 11 of 1995))
Dietitians Act 1981	No. 9676	22 December 1981
An Act to re-enact and amend the Law relating to Dietitians and the Practice of Dietetics, and for other purposes.
Industrial Training (Further Amendment) Act 1981 (repealed)	No. 9677	22 December 1981
An Act to amend further the Industrial Training Act 1975 and for other purposes. (Repealed by Statute Law Revision Act 1995 (No. 11 of 1995))
Employment and Training Act 1981	No. 9678	22 December 1981
An Act to establish a Ministry of Employment and Training, to make provision with respect to the functions of the Ministry and for other purposes.
Employment and Training (Pay-roll Tax Rebate) Act 1981 (repealed)	No. 9679	22 December 1981
An Act to amend the Employment and Training Act 1981, (Note: Employment and Training Act 1981 (No. 9678)) to provide for a rebate on pay-roll tax paid in respect of first-year apprentices and for other purposes. (Repealed by Statute Law Revision Act 1995 (No. 11 of 1995))
Motor Car (Drivers' Licences) Act 1981	No. 9680	22 December 1981
An Act to amend Part III. of the Motor Car Act 1958 with respect to the Licensing of Drivers and for other purposes.
Dried Fruits (Amendment) Act 1981 (repealed)	No. 9681	23 December 1981
An Act to amend the Dried Fruits Act 1958 (Note: Dried Fruits Act 1958 (No. 6239)) with respect to the Constitution and Functions of the Victorian Dried Fruits Board and for other purposes. (Repealed by Statute Law Revision Act 1995 (No. 11 of 1995))

== Sources ==
- "1981 Victorian Historical Acts". AustLII.
