= List of acts of the Parliament of Victoria from 1976 =

This is a list of acts of the Parliament of Victoria, Australia for the year 1976.

== 1976 ==
Short title, or popular name	Citation	Royal assent
Long title
Ballarat College of Advanced Education Act 1976	No. 8833	6 May 1976
An Act to make Provision concerning the Ballarat College of Advanced Education, and for other purposes.
Gippsland Folk Museum Act 1976 (repealed)	No. 8850	8 June 1976
An Act to make Provision for the Establishment of a Gippsland Folk Museum Authority for developing and fostering the Gippsland Folk Museum at Moe and for Purposes connected therewith. (Repealed by Swan Hill Pioneer Settlement Authority (Repeal) Act 1994 (No. 46 of 1994))
Joint Select Committee (Conservation of Energy Resources) Act 1976 (repealed)	No. 8851	8 June 1976
An Act to constitute a Joint Select Committee to inquire into and report upon the Conservation of Energy Resources in Victoria and for other purposes. (Repealed by Parliamentary Committees (Joint Investigatory Committees) Act 1982 (No. 9765))
Tomato Processing Industry Act 1976	No. 8852	8 June 1976
An Act to improve Stability in the Tomato Processing Industry.
Small Business Development Corporation Act 1976	No. 8854	8 June 1976
An Act to constitute a Small Business Development Corporation to encourage and promote the Development of Small Businesses.
Victorian Film Corporation Act 1976	No. 8864	8 June 1976
An Act to constitute a Victorian Film Corporation to encourage and promote the Production, Exhibition, and Distribution of Films, Television Programmes, and other Entertainments and Works.
Motor Car (Breath Testing Stations) Act 1976	No. 8865	8 June 1976
An Act to amend the Motor Car Act 1958 (Note: Motor Car Act 1958 (No. 6325)) in relation to the Detection of Persons whose Ability to drive a Motor Car is impaired by the Consumption of Alcoholic Liquor, and for other purposes.
Deakin University (Amendment) Act 1976	No. 8867	8 June 1976
All Act to amend the Deakin University Act 1974 (Note: Deakin University Act 1974 (No. 8610)) with respect to the Re-employment of certain Academic Staff of the Gordon Institute of Technology and the State College at Geelong.
Victorian Development Corporation Act 1976	No. 8869	8 June 1976
An Act to amend the Victorian Development Corporation Act 1973 (Note: Victorian Development Corporation Act 1973 (No. 8428)) and for other purposes.
Abattoir and Meat Inspection (Amendment) Act 1976	No. 8874	16 June 1976
An Act to amend the Abattoir and Meat Inspection Act 1973. (Note: Abattoir and Meat Inspection Act 1973 (No. 8404))
Victoria Grants Commission Act 1976 or the Victorian Local Government Grants Commission Act 1976	No. 8887	26 October 1976
An Act to establish a Victoria Grants Commission to determine the Allocation of Financial Assistance to Municipalities in Victoria and for other purposes.
Gordon Technical College Act 1976	No. 8889	16 November 1976
An Act to provide for the Establishment of an Institution to be known as the Gordon Technical College to assume certain of the Functions performed by the Gordon Institute of Technology at Geelong, and for other purposes.
Vital State Projects Act 1976	No. 8896	30 November 1976
An Act to make Provision with respect to the Planning, Construction, Maintenance and Operation of certain Vital State Projects and for other purposes.
Victorian Institute of Secondary Education Act 1976	No. 8904	30 November 1976
An act to establish a Victorian Institute of Secondary Education and for other purposes.
Melbourne and Metropolitan Tramways (East Burwood Tramway) Act 1976 (repealed)	No. 8910	7 December 1976
An Act to authorize the Construction by the Melbourne and Metropolitan Tramways Board of an Electric Tramway in the Cities of Camberwell, Box Hill and Nunawading. (Repealed by Transport Act 1983 (No. 9921))
Employers and Employés (Repeal) Act 1976 or the Employers and Employees (Repeal) Act 1976	No. 8915	7 December 1976
An Act to repeal the Employers and Employés Act 1958, (Note: Employers and Employés Act 1958 (No. 6242)) to amend the Supreme Court Act 1958 (Note: Supreme Court Act 1958 (No. 6387)) and the Wrongs Act 1958 (Note: Wrongs Act 1958 (No. 6420)) and for other purposes.
Marine (Amendment) Act 1976	No. 8924	7 December 1976
An Act to amend the Marine Act 1958 (Note: Marine Act 1958 (No. 6302)) and for other purposes.
Ports and Harbors Act 1976	No. 8926	7 December 1976
An Act to amend the Geelong Harbor Trust Act 1958, (Note: Geelong Harbor Trust Act 1958 (No. 6262)) the Harbor Boards Act 1958, (Note: Harbor Boards Act 1958 (No. 6268)) the Marine Act 1958, and the Melbourne Harbor Trust Act 1958 (Note: Melbourne Harbor Trust Act 1958 (No. 6312)) with respect to the Use of Port Facilities and the Removal from Ports of sunken abandoned and other Vessels and Hulls.
Acts Interpretation (Amendment) Act 1976	No. 8944	14 December 1976
An Act to make Provision with respect to the Application of the Laws of Victoria in Certain Off-shore Areas adjacent to Victoria, to make Further Provision for the Exercise of Statutory Powers between the Passing and Commencement of Acts, to amend the Acts Interpretation Act 1958 (Note: Acts Interpretation Act 1958 (No. 6189)) and for other purposes.
Rape Offences (Proceedings) Act 1976	No. 8950	14 December 1976
An Act to make further provision with respect to the Trial of Persons for Rape, Attempted Rape and Assault with Intent to Rape, to amend the Magistrates (Summary Proceedings) Act 1975, (Note: Magistrates (Summary Proceedings) Act 1975 (No. 8731)) the Evidence Act 1958, (Note: Evidence Act 1958 (No. 6246)) the Crimes Act 1958 (Note: Crimes Act 1958 (No. 6231)) and for other purposes.
Metropolitan Fire Brigades Superannuation Act 1976	No. 8952	16 December 1976
An Act to constitute a Metropolitan Fire Brigades Superannuation Board, to make Provision for the Administration by the said Board of a Metropolitan Fire Brigades Superannuation Fund, to provide for the Transfer to the said Board of certain Assets and the Responsibility for the Administration thereof, and for other purposes.
Minerals and Energy Act 1976 (repealed)	No. 8953	16 December 1976
An Act to make Provision for and with respect to the Creation of a Department of Minerals and Energy, to amend the Coal Mines Act 1958, (Note: Coal Mines Act 1958 (No. 6221)) the Gas and Fuel Corporation Act 1958, (Note: Gas and Fuel Corporation Act 1958 (No. 6260)) the Health Act 1958, (Note: Health Act 1958 (No. 6270)) the Mines Act 1958, (Note: Mines Act 1958 (No. 6320)) the Mining Development Act 1958, (Note: Mining Development Act 1958 (No. 6321)) the Petroleum Act 1958, (Note: Petroleum Act 1958 (No. 6334)) the Extractive Industries Act 1966, (Note: Extractive Industries Act 1966 (No. 7499)) the Pipelines Act 1967, (Note: Pipelines Act 1967 (No. 7541)) the Petroleum (Submerged Lands) Act 1967, (Note: Petroleum (Submerged Lands) Act 1967 (No. 7591)) the Groundwater Act 1969 (Note: Groundwater Act 1969 (No. 7849)) and the Public Service Act 1974, (Note: Public Service Act 1974 (No. 8658)) and for other purposes. (Repealed by Statute Law Revision (Repeals) Act 1999 (No. 3 of 1999))
Ministry of Immigration and Ethnic Affairs Act 1976	No. 8963	16 December 1976
An Act to establish a Ministry of Immigration and Ethnic Affairs, to assist Migrants and Members of Ethnic Groups to settle in Victoria, and for other purposes.
Building Societies Act 1976 (repealed)	No. 8966	21 December 1976
An Act to consolidate and amend the Law relating to Building Societies, and for other purposes. (Repealed by Building Societies Act 1986 (No. 8 of 1986))
Water and Sewerage Authorities (Accident Insurance and Employés Long Service Leave) Act 1976 or the Water and Sewerage Authorities (Accident Insurance and Employees Long Service Leave) Act 1976	No. 8967	21 December 1976
An Act to make Further Provision with respect to Accident Insurance for Commissioners and Members of certain Water and Sewerage Authorities and Further Provision with respect to Long Service Leave for Employés of those Authorities, and for other purposes.
Upper Yarra Valley and Dandenong Ranges Authority Act 1976 (repealed)	No. 8968	21 December 1976
An Act to make Provision with respect to the Protection and Conservation of the Upper Yarra Valley and the Dandenong Ranges and for other purposes. (Repealed by Planning Authorities Repeal Act 1994 (No. 118 of 1994))
Appeal Costs Fund (Amendment) Act 1976	No.	
Appropriation (1976-77, No. 1) Act 1976	No.	
Architects (Amendment) Act 1976	No.	
Australian Tractor Testing Station Act 1976	No.	
Barley Marketing (Amendment) Act 1976	No.	
Bees (Amendment) Act 1976	No.	
Bendigo College of Advanced Education Act 1976	No.	
Box Hill Land Act 1976	No.	
Building Contracts (Deposits) (Amendment) Act 1976	No.	
Building Industry Long Service Leave (Amendment) Act 1976	No.	
Business Franchise (Tobacco) Act 1976	No.	
Cemeteries (Amendment) Act 1976	No.	
Cluster Titles (Amendment) Act 1976	No.	
Co-operation (Amendment) Act 1976	No.	
Co-operative Housing Societies (Amendment) Act 1976	No.	
Coal Mines (Pensions) Act 1976	No.	
Committees (Membership) Act 1976	No.	
Commonwealth and States Financial Agreement Act 1976	No.	
Companies (Fees) Act 1976	No.	
Constitution (Responsible Ministers) Act 1976	No.	
Constitution (Validation of Elections) Act 1976	No.	
Country Fire Authority (Amendment) Act 1976	No.	
County Court (Amendment) Act 1976	No.	
Crimes Act 1976	No.	
Crown Reservations (Revocations and Excisions) Act 1976	No.	
Dandenong (Shepley Oval) Land Act 1976	No.	
Dandenong Valley Authority (Amendment) Act 1976	No.	
Dentists (Amendment) Act 1976	No.	
Dietitions Registration (Fees) Act 1976	No.	
Education (Minister of Special Education) Act 1976	No.	
Education (Special Developmental Schools) Act 1976	No.	
Educational Grants (Continuation) Act 1976	No.	
Educational Institutions (Guarantees) Act 1976	No.	
Forests (Advances) Act 1976	No.	
Forests (Fire Prevention and Protection) (Amendment) Act 1976	No.	
Friendly Societies (Amendment) Act 1976	No.	
Gas and Fuel Corporation (Borrowing Powers) Act 1976	No.	
Gold Buyers (Repeal) Act 1976	No.	
Health (Fees) Act 1976	No.	
Home Finance (Amendment) Act 1976	No.	
Home Finance (Loans and Guarantees) Act 1976	No.	
Hospitals Superannuation (Amendment) Act 1976	No.	
Housing (Amendment) Act 1976	No.	
Joint Select Committee (Meat Industry) Act 1976	No.	
Joint Select Committee (Road Safety) Act 1976	No.	
Judges Salaries Act 1976	No.	
Labour and Industry (Amendment) Act 1976	No.	
Land (Surrender of Lands) Act 1976	No.	
Land Tax Act 1976	No.	
Lands Compensation (Amendment) Act 1976	No.	
Latrobe Valley (Manager's Qualifications) Act 1976	No.	
Legal Profession Practice (Guarantee Fund) Act 1976	No.	
Liquefied Gases (Amendment) Act 1976	No.	
Liquor Control (Exhibition Buildings) Act 1976	No.	
Liquor Control (Fees) Act 1976	No.	
Liquor Control (Orderly Marketing) Act 1976	No.	
Local Government (City of Sunshine) Act 1976	No.	
Local Government (House Builders' Liability) Act 1976	No.	
Local Government (Rates) Amendment Act 1976	No.	
Magistrates (Summary Proceedings) (Amendment) Act 1976	No.	
Magistrates' Courts (Amendment) Act 1976	No.	
Marketing of Primary Products (Marketing Boards) Act 1976	No.	
Melbourne and Metropolitan Board of Works (Municipalities Contributions) Act 1976	No.	
Melbourne Underground Rail Loop (Financial Contributions) Act 1976	No.	
Mental Health (Amendment) Act 1976	No.	
Mildura College Lands (Schools Fund) Act 1976	No.	
Mildura Irrigation and Water Trusts (Amendment) Act 1976	No.	
Mines Act 1976	No.	
Ministry for the Arts (Transfer of Administration) Act 1976	No.	
Ministry of Transport (Amendment) Act 1976	No.	
Money Lenders (Credit Societies) Act 1976	No.	
Motor Car (Fees) Act 1976	No.	
Nar Nar Goon Land Exchange Act 1976	No.	
National Gallery of Victoria (Development Collection) Act 1976	No.	
Northcote Children's Home Act 1976	No.	
Ombudsman (Municipalities) Act 1976	No.	
Parliamentary Allowances Act 1976	No.	
Patriotic Funds (Amendment) Act 1976	No.	
Pay-roll Tax Act 1976	No.	
Pensioners' Rates Remission Act 1976	No.	
Pesticides (Amendment) Act 1976	No.	
Poisons (Drugs of Addiction) Act 1976	No.	
Police Regulation (Long Service Leave) Act 1976	No.	
Private Agents (Amendment) Act 1976	No.	
Probate Duty Act 1976	No.	
Provincial Sewerage Authorities Association of Victoria (Financial Year) Act 1976	No.	
Psychological Practices (Psychologists' Qualifications) Act 1976	No.	
Public Servants Ethical Conduct (Joint Select Committee) Act 1976	No.	
Public Service (Amendment) Act 1976	No.	
Public Service (Long Service Leave) Act 1976	No.	
Public Works and Services (Further Expenditure) Act 1976	No.	
Public Works and Services Act 1976	No.	
Racing (Amendment) Act 1976	No.	
Railways (Participation in Pipeline Operations Payments) Act 1976	No.	
Railways (Penalties) Act 1976	No.	
Revocation and Excision of Crown Reservations Act 1976	No.	
River Improvement (United Districts) Act 1976	No.	
Second-Hand Dealers (Charity Collectors) Act 1976	No.	
Sewerage Districts (Amendment) Act 1976	No.	
Shearers Accommodation Act 1976	No.	
State Electricity Commission (Loy Yang Power Station) Act 1976	No.	
State Forests Works and Services Act 1976	No.	
Supply (1976-77, No. 1) Act 1976	No.	
Supreme Court Act 1976	No.	
Tattersall Consultations (Soccer Football Pools) Act 1976	No.	
Taxation Appeals (Amendment) Act 1976	No.	
Teacher Housing (Amendment) Act 1976	No.	
Teaching Service (Professional Appointments) Act 1976	No.	
Transport Works and Services Act 1976	No.	
Trustee Companies (Union-Fidelity) Amendment Act 1976	No.	
Victoria Racing Club (Borrowings) Act 1976	No.	
Water (Amendment) Act 1976	No.	
Water Supply Works and Services Act 1976 (repealed)	No. 8905	
(Repealed by Treasury Legislation (Repeal) Act 2005 (No. 73 of 2005))
Waterworks Trusts Association of Victoria (Financial Year) Act 1976	No.	
Weights and Measures (Amendment) Act 1976	No.	
Wild Flowers and Native Plants Protection (Amendment) Act 1976	No.	
Wodonga Area Land Acquisition (Amendment) Act 1976	No.	

== Sources ==
- "1976 Victorian Historical Acts". AustLII.
