= List of acts of the Parliament of Victoria from 1974 =

This is a list of acts of the Parliament of Victoria, Australia for the year 1974.

== 1974 ==
Short title, or popular name	Citation	Royal assent
Long title
Consumer Protection (Unordered Goods and Services Amendment) Act 1974	No. 8540	30 April 1974
An Act to amend Division 4 of Part II. of the Consumer Protection Act 1972 (Note: Consumer Protection Act 1972 (No. 8276)) and for other purposes.
Supply (No. 1, 1974-75) Act 1974	No. 8545	30 April 1974
An Act to make Interim Provision for the Appropriation of Moneys out of the Consolidated Fund for the Service of the Financial Year 1974-75.
Swan Hill Pioneer Settlement Act 1974 (repealed)	No. 8548	7 May 1974
An Act to make Provision for the Establishment of the Swan Hill Pioneer Settlement Authority and the Management and Control of the Swan Hill Pioneer Settlement. (Repealed by Swan Hill Pioneer Settlement Authority (Repeal) Act 1994 (No. 46 of 1994))
Forests (Wood Pulp Agreements) Act 1974	No. 8563	14 May 1974
An Act to ratify validate approve and otherwise give effect to an Agreement between the Minister of Forests the Forests Commission and Australian Paper Manufacturers Limited supplemental to the Wood Pulp Agreement made in 1961 and amended in 1966, to ratify validate approve and otherwise give effect to an Agreement between the Forests Commission and Australian Paper Manufacturers Limited with respect to Supplies of Softwood Timber to amend the Forests (Wood Pulp Agreement) Act 1961 (Note: Forests (Wood Pulp Agreement) Act 1961 (No. 6796)) and for other purposes.
Appropriation (1973-74, No. 2) Act 1974	No. 8567	14 May 1974
An Act to appropriate certain Sums out of the Consolidated Fund for the Service of the Financial Year 1973-74.
Appropriation (1973-74, No. 3) Act 1974	No. 8570	14 May 1974
An Act to appropriate certain Sums out of the Consolidated Fund for the Service of the Financial Year 1973-74.
Supply (No. 2, 1974-75) Act 1974	No. 8571	14 May 1974
An Act to make Interim Provision for the Appropriation of Moneys out of the Consolidated Fund for the Service of the Financial Year 1974-75.
Victorian Inland Meat Authority Act 1974	No. 8572	14 May 1974
An Act to make Provision with respect to the Disposal of the Assets and Undertakings of the Victorian Inland Meat Authority and for other purposes.
Metropolitan Bridges Highways and Foreshores Act 1974 (repealed)	No. 8573	14 May 1974
An Act to make Provision concerning Metropolitan Bridges Main Highways and Foreshores, for that and other Purposes to amend the Melbourne and Metropolitan Board of Works Act 1958, (Note: Melbourne and Metropolitan Board of Works Act 1958 (No. 6310)) the Country Roads Act 1958 (Note: Country Roads Act 1958 (No. 6229)) and the Local Government Department Act 1958, (Note: Local Government Department Act 1958 (No. 6479)) and for other purposes. (Repealed by Transport Act 1983 (No. 9921))
Newmarket Sheep Sales Act 1974	No. 8580	15 October 1974
An Act to consolidate and amend the Law relating to the Regulation of the Sale of Sheep at the Newmarket Saleyards in the City of Melbourne.
Pharmacists Act 1974	No. 8593	19 November 1974
An Act to re-enact with Amendments the Law relating to the Registration of Pharmacists and for Purposes connected therewith.
Business Franchise (Tobacco) Act 1974	No. 8597	26 November 1974
An Act with respect to the licensing of Persons who sell Tobacco in Victoria and for other purposes.
Status of Children Act 1974	No. 8602	26 November 1974
An Act to remove the Legal Disabilities of Children born out of Wedlock.
Appropriation (1974-75, No. 1) Act 1974	No. 8605	26 November 1974
An Act appropriate certain Sums out of the Consolidated Fund for the Service of the Financial Year 1974-75 and to appropriate the Supplies granted in the last preceding Session of Parliament and for other purposes.
Fertilizers Act 1974	No. 8604	26 November 1974
An Act to consolidate and amend the law relating to the Siale of Agricultural Limes, Fertilizers and Soil Conditioners and for other purposes.
Aboriginal Affairs (Transfer of Functions) Act 1974 (repealed)	No. 8606	3 December 1974
An Act to make provision with respect to the transfer of functions in relation to Aboriginal Affairs, to repeal the Aboriginal Affairs Act 1967, (Note: Aboriginal Affairs Act 1967 (No. 7574)) to amend the Aboriginal Lands Act 1970 (Note: Aboriginal Lands Act 1970 (No. 8044)) and the Archaeological and Aboriginal Relics Preservation Act 1972 (Note: Archaeological and Aboriginal Relics Preservation Act 1972 (No. 8273)) and for other purposes. (Repealed by Statute Law Repeals Act 2012 (No. 30 of 2012))
Victorian Institute of Marine Sciences Act 1974 (repealed)	No. 8607	3 December 1974
An Act to establish a Victorian Institute of Marine Sciences and for Purposes connected therewith. (Repealed by Victorian Institute of Marine Sciences (Repeal) Act 1998 (No. 74 of 1998))
Deakin University Act 1974	No. 8610	10 December 1974
An Act for the Establishment and Incorporation of a University to be known as Deakin University and for other purposes.
West Gate Bridge Authority Act 1974	No. 8623	10 December 1974
An Act to amend the Lower Yarra Crossing Authority Act 1965. (Note: Lower Yarra Crossing Authority Act 1965 (No. 7365))
Victorian Public Offices Corporation Act 1974	No. 8626	10 December 1974
An Act to constitute a Victorian Public Offices Corporation, to make Provision with respect to the Construction Management and Maintenance of certain Public Offices and for other purposes.
Water Supply Works and Services Act 1974 (repealed)	No. 8629	17 December 1974
An Act to authorize Expenditure on Works and Services and other Purposes relating to Irrigation Water Supply Drainage Sewerage Flood Protection and River Improvement, and other purposes. (Repealed by Treasury Legislation (Repeal) Act 2005 (No. 73 of 2005))
Consumer Affairs Act 1974	No. 8630	17 December 1974
An Act to amend the Short Title of the Consumer Protection Act 1972, to prohibit or regulate certain Practices and for those and other Purposes to amend the Consumer Protection Act 1972, to amend the Ministry of Consumer Affairs Act 1973 (Note: Ministry of Consumer Affairs Act 1973 (No. 8442)) and for other purposes.
Melbourne University (Amendment) Act 1974	No. 8638	17 December 1974
An Act to amend the Melbourne University Act 1958. (Note: University Act 1958 (No. 6405))
Health (Contraceptives) Act 1974 (repealed)	No. 8642	17 December 1974
An Act to make Provision for the Registration, Advertising and Sale of Contraceptives and for that Purpose to amend Part XIV. of the Health Act 1958, (Note: Health Act 1958 (No. 6270)) to repeal Division 4 of Part I. of the Summary Offences Act 1966 (Note: Summary Offences Act 1966 (No. 7405)) and to amend Division 2 of Part VI. of the Labour and Industry Act 1958 (Note: Labour and Industry Act 1958 (No. 6283)) and for other purposes. (Repealed by Statute Law Revision (Repeals) Act 1999 (No. 3 of 1999))
Local Government (Municipal Employés Long Service Leave) Act 1974 or the Local Government (Municipal Employees Long Service Leave) Act 1974	No. 8645	17 December 1974
An Act to amend the Local Government Act 1958 (Note: Local Government Act 1958 (No. 6299)) to make further provision with respect to Long Service Leave for Municipal Employés and for other purposes.
Public Service Act 1974 (repealed)	No. 8658	20 December 1974
An Act to Consolidate and Amend the Law Relating to the Public Service of Victoria and for other purposes. (Repealed by Public Sector Management Act 1992 (No. 68 of 1992))
Cluster Titles Act 1974	No. 8661	20 December 1974
An Act to facilitate the Subdivision of Land in Cluster Form, the Issue of Titles to Lots shown on Plans of Cluster Subdivision, and the Administration of Land Subdivided in Cluster Form, to amend the Health Act 1958, the Local Government Act 1958, the Town and Country Planning Act 1961, (Note: Town and Country Planning Act 1961 (No. 6849)) the Sale of Land Act 1962 (Note: Sale of Land Act 1962 (No. 6975)) and the Strata Titles Act 1967, (Note: Strata Titles Act 1967 (No. 7551)) and for other purposes.
Bittern Land Act 1974	No.	
Bonnie Doon (Public Hall) Land Act 1974	No.	
Bread Industry (Amendment) Act 1974	No.	
Carlton Land (University Women's College) Act 1974	No.	
Carriers and Innkeepers (Licences) Act 1974	No.	
Cattle and Swine Compensation (Amendment) Act 1974	No.	
Cemeteries (Pioneer Memorial Parks) Act 1974	No.	
Chiropodists (Additional Training of Applicants) Act 1974	No.	
Co-operative Housing Societies (Amendment) Act 1974	No.	
Co-operative Housing Societies Act 1974	No.	
Commonwealth Places (Administration of Laws) Act 1974	No.	
Companies (Interstate Corporate Affairs Commission) Act 1974	No.	
Country Fire Authority (Amendment) Act 1974	No.	
Country Roads (Salaries and Contributions) Act 1974	No.	
County Court (Chief Judge) Act 1974	No.	
Decentralized Industry (Housing) (Amendment) Act 1974	No.	
Dental Alumni Research Foundation Act 1974	No.	
Dried Fruits (Amendment) Act 1974	No.	
Education (Teacher Registration) Act 1974	No.	
Education (Work Experience) Act 1974	No.	
Educational Grants (Continuation) Act 1974	No.	
Electoral Provinces and Districts Act 1974	No.	
Environment Protection (Amendment) Act 1974	No.	
Extractive Industries (Amendment) Act 1974	No.	
Farm Produce Merchants and Commission Agents (Amendment) Act 1974	No.	
Forests (Amendment) Act 1974	No.	
Gas and Fuel Corporation (Powers) Act 1974	No.	
Geelong Land Act 1974	No.	
Groundwater (Amendment) Act 1974	No.	
Harbors and Navigable Waters Control Act 1974	No.	
Historic Buildings Act 1974	No.	
Home Finance (Amendment) Act 1974	No.	
Housing (Amendment) Act 1974	No.	
Housing (Commonwealth-State Supplemental Agreement) Act 1974	No.	
Justices (Theft Offences) Act 1974	No.	
Labour and Industry (Amendment) Act 1974	No.	
Labour and Industry (Art and Handicraft Galleries) Act 1974	No.	
Land (Amendment) Act 1974	No.	
Land Tax (Amendment) Act 1974	No.	
Land Tax Act 1974	No.	
Latrobe Valley (Amendment) Act 1974	No.	
Liquor Control (Fees) Act 1974	No.	
Local Government (Amendment No. 2) Act 1974	No.	
Local Government (Amendment) Act 1974	No.	
Local Government (House Builders' Liability Amendment) Act 1974	No.	
Local Government (Municipal Abattoirs) Act 1974	No.	
Local Government (Shire of Bacchus Marsh) Act 1974	No.	
Lotteries Gaming and Betting (Amendment) Act 1974	No.	
Marine Stores and Old Metals (Beverage Cans) Act 1974	No.	
Meat Inspection Services Act 1974	No.	
Melbourne (Alexandra Gardens) Land Act 1974	No.	
Melbourne and Metropolitan Board of Works (Amendment) Act 1974	No.	
Melbourne and Metropolitan Board of Works (Rates) Act 1974	No.	
Melbourne and Metropolitan Tramways (Amendment) Act 1974	No.	
Melbourne Cricket Club Act 1974	No.	
Mildura Irrigation and Water Trusts (Amendment) Act 1974	No.	
Milk and Dairy Supervision (Amendment) Act 1974	No.	
Milk Board (Delivery Charges) Act 1974	No.	
Ministry of Transport (Consultative Committees) Act 1974	No.	
Ministry of Transport (Transport Fund) Act 1974	No.	
Morwell and Mirboo Railway Removal Act 1974	No.	
Motor Boating (Amendment) Act 1974	No.	
Motor Car (Fees) Act 1974	No.	
Motor Car (Further Amendment) Act 1974	No.	
Motor Car Act 1974	No.	
Municipalities Assistance (Amendment) Act 1974	No.	
Ombudsman (Exemption) Act 1974	No.	
Pay-roll Tax (Rate) Act 1974	No.	
Pay-roll Tax Act 1974	No.	
Pesticides (Amendment) Act 1974	No.	
Pounds (Amendment) Act 1974	No.	
Printers and Newspapers (Amendment) Act 1974	No.	
Public Lands and Works (Amendment) Act 1974	No.	
Public Servants Ethical Conduct (Joint Select Committee) Act 1974	No.	
Public Works and Services Act 1974	No.	
Racing (Amendment) Act 1974	No.	
Racing (Further Amendment) Act 1974	No.	
Railway Works and Services Act 1974	No.	
Registration of Births Deaths and Marriages (Amendment) Act 1974	No.	
Revocation and Excision of Crown Reservations Act 1974	No.	
River Improvement (Minimum Rate) Act 1974	No.	
Road Safety (Educational) Act 1974	No.	
Sewerage Districts (Amendment) Act 1974	No.	
Sewerage Districts (Interest Subsidies) Act 1974	No.	
Small Claims Tribunals (Amendment) Act 1974	No.	
Stamps (Bills of Exchange) (Amendment) Act 1974	No.	
Stamps (Bills of Exchange) Act 1974	No.	
Stamps (Credit and Rental Business) Act 1974	No.	
State Forests Works and Services Act 1974	No.	
Stock (Artificial Breeding) (Amendment) Act 1974	No.	
Superannuation (Railway Service) Act 1974	No.	
Tattersall Consultations (Soccer Football Pools) Act 1974	No.	
Teaching Service (Conditions of Service) Act 1974	No.	
Terang Mechanics Institute and Free Library Trust Act 1974	No.	
Alfred Nicholas Memorial Gardens Act 1974	No.	
Valuation of Land (Amendment) Act 1974	No.	
Veterinary Research Institute (Consequential Amendment) Act 1974	No.	
Victorian Civil Ambulance Service Act 1974	No.	
Wheat Industry Stabilization Act 1974	No.	
Wheat Marketing Act 1974	No.	
Wodonga Area Land Acquisition (Amendment) Act 1974	No.	
Youth, Sport and Recreation (Amendment) Act 1974	No.	
Zoological Gardens (Amendment) Act 1974	No.	

== Sources ==
- "1974 Victorian Historical Acts". AustLII.
