= PS Oscar W =

Restored paddle steamer

Coordinates: 35°30′16″S 138°47′10″E

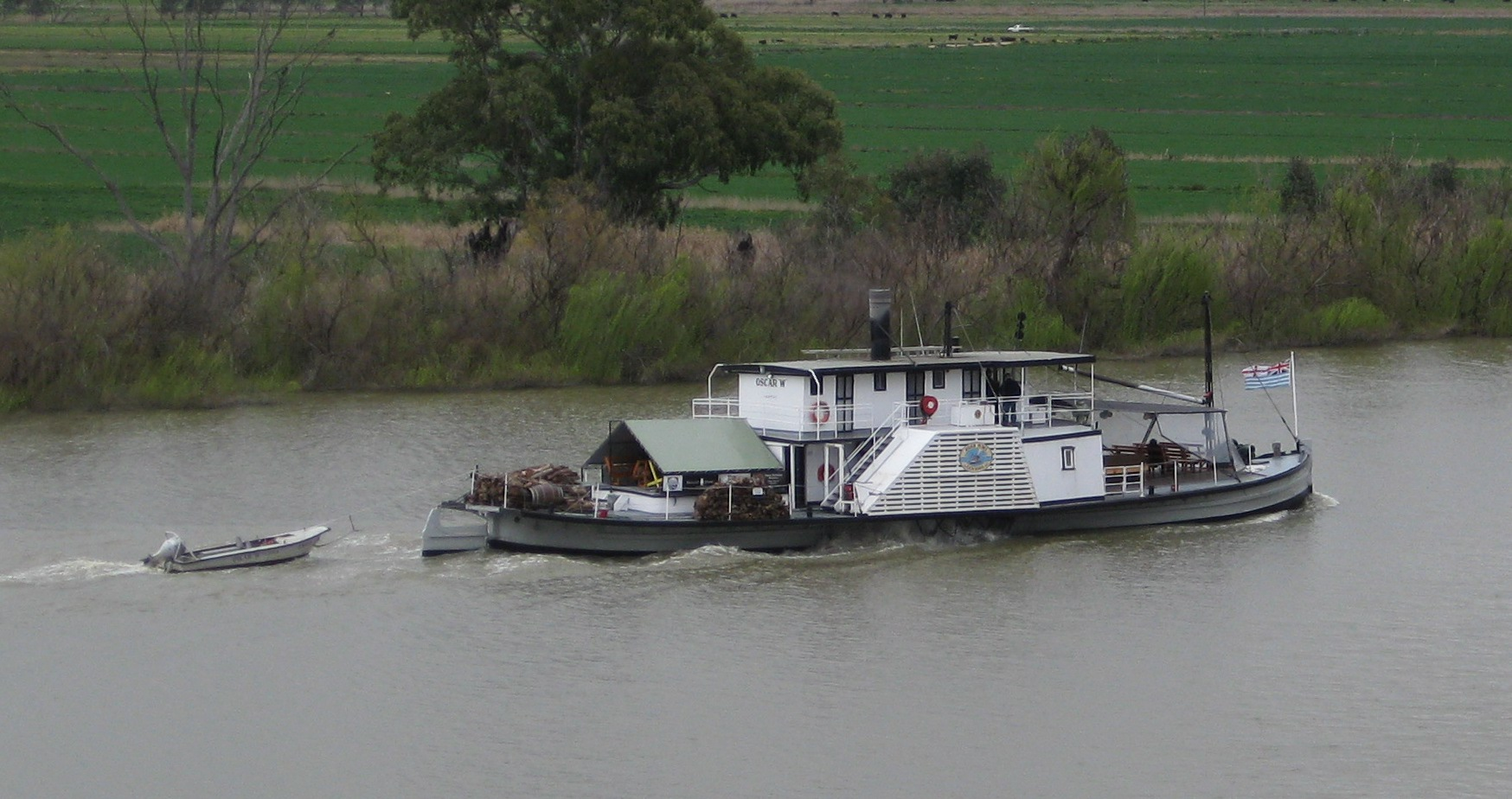

History

Australia
- Name: Oscar W
- Owner: Charles Wallin (1908–1914); Permewan Wright/Murray Shipping Company (1914–1942); George Ritchie (1942–1943); South Aust. Govt. Highways Dept. (1943–1960); Paddy Hogg (1960–1964); Allan Moritz (1964–1985); SA Tourist Commission (1985– )
- Operator: Friends of PS Oscar W
- Port of registry: Melbourne, Victoria
- Route: River Murray, Australia
- Ordered: 1908
- Builder: Charlie Wallin
- Commissioned: 1908
- Homeport: Goolwa, South Australia
- Identification: 120751
- Nickname(s): Oscar
- Status: Tourist vessel

General characteristics
- Class & type: Composite Paddle Steamer
- Tonnage: 83 GT 60 NT
- Length: 103 ft 1 in (31.42 m)
- Beam: 20 ft 2 in (6.15 m)
- Propulsion: Steam
- Notes: Data compiled from three sources

The PS Oscar W is a restored paddle steamer located at Goolwa in South Australia.

== History ==
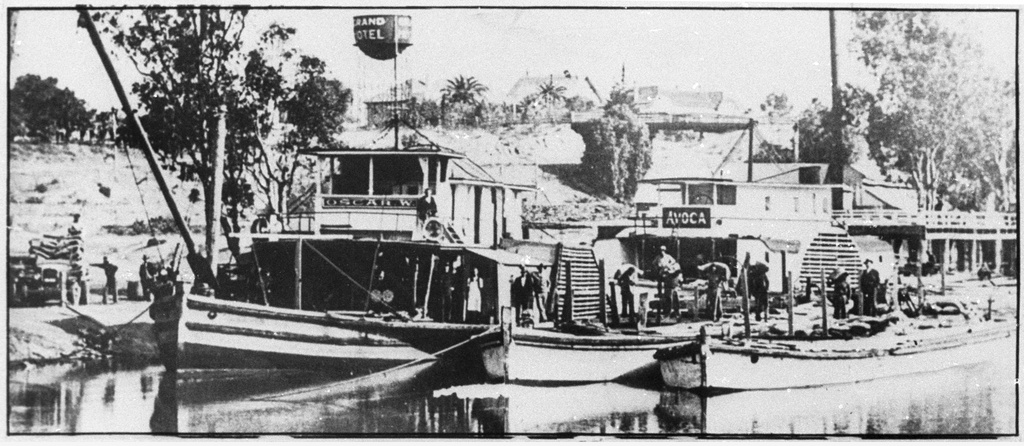
The PS Oscar W and PS Avoca at Mildura (c. 1900)

(Frans) Oscar "Charlie" Wallin (1867 – 16 August 1934), born in Sweden and naturalised as a British subject in Australia in 1897, owned and skippered several steamboats on the Murray–Darling river system. He built the boat at Echuca in 1908, and named it for his son Oscar William Wallin (c. July 1897 – 20 September 1917) who fought with the 8th Battalion in World War I, and was killed in action in Belgium. She was taken over by the shipping firm Permewan, Wright and Co. in 1909; Wallin became owner of the steamer Clyde as part of the deal. The Murray Shipping Company was formed in 1919, as a result of the amalgamation of the shipping interests of a number of local riverboat trading companies due to the diminishing trade. This included Permewan Wright, and the Oscar W became one of the vessels to transfer to the new company.

By 1942, the Murray River shipping industry had begun to dry up, with the tourist passenger trade beginning to take over. Due to wartime shortages of materials and manpower the Oscar W was unable to become a tourist vessel, and in late 1943 was sold to the South Australian Government Highways Department to service ferries along the river. The SAGHD converted her to an oil burning vessel in 1945, due to the lack of cut wood available along the river. The Oscar W was replaced in 1959, and was sold to Paddy Hogg in 1960 for £50.

Hogg took the Oscar W to Mildura to commence work as a tourism vessel. Notably, the Oscar W was responsible for towing the PS Gem from Mildura to Swan Hill in 1963, where it became a static display within the new Pioneer Settlement. The journey was expected to take ten days; however, due to low river levels the journey eventually took eight months.

Hogg sold the vessel in 1964 to Allan Moritz, who began the process of restoration with a series of major hull repairs. Moritz died prior to the project's completion, and as a resulting lack of funds the Oscar W was sold to the South Australia Tourist Commission in 1985. The boat was returned to the river and steamed back to Goolwa, arriving 31 March 1988. The Oscar W has since operated as a tourist vessel, as well as completing extended journeys along the Murray River. One such example was the trip from Goolwa to Echuca in 1991, over the course of seven weeks.

== Particulars ==
The Oscar W is 31.52 metres in length, with a beam of 6.27 metres and a draft of 68 cm to 155 cm. It weighs 84.3 tonnes gross, 60 tonnes net.

The paddle steamer is of composite construction and was built from steel topsides and three-inch red gum below. The engine gives out 16 hp—a wood-burning Marshall Steam engine.

The Oscar W was associated with a composite barge known as The Dart, constructed by D Milne at Goolwa in 1912. Originally built as a floating work platform, the barge was used as a pile-driving vessel during the construction of weirs and locks. In 1971 The Dart was taken to Murray Bridge and partially restored, then sunk nearby in shallow water to preserve the timber hull. It was raised in 1985 when purchased by the District Council of Port Elliot and Goolwa, and returned to Goolwa. The Dart has since been used ceremonially, such as being towed behind the Oscar W from Goolwa to Mildura in both 1992 and 2001. In 2008, The Dart sunk at its mooring, and was placed on land awaiting restoration.
