= PV Pyap =

Paddle vessel at Pioneer Settlement, Swan Hill

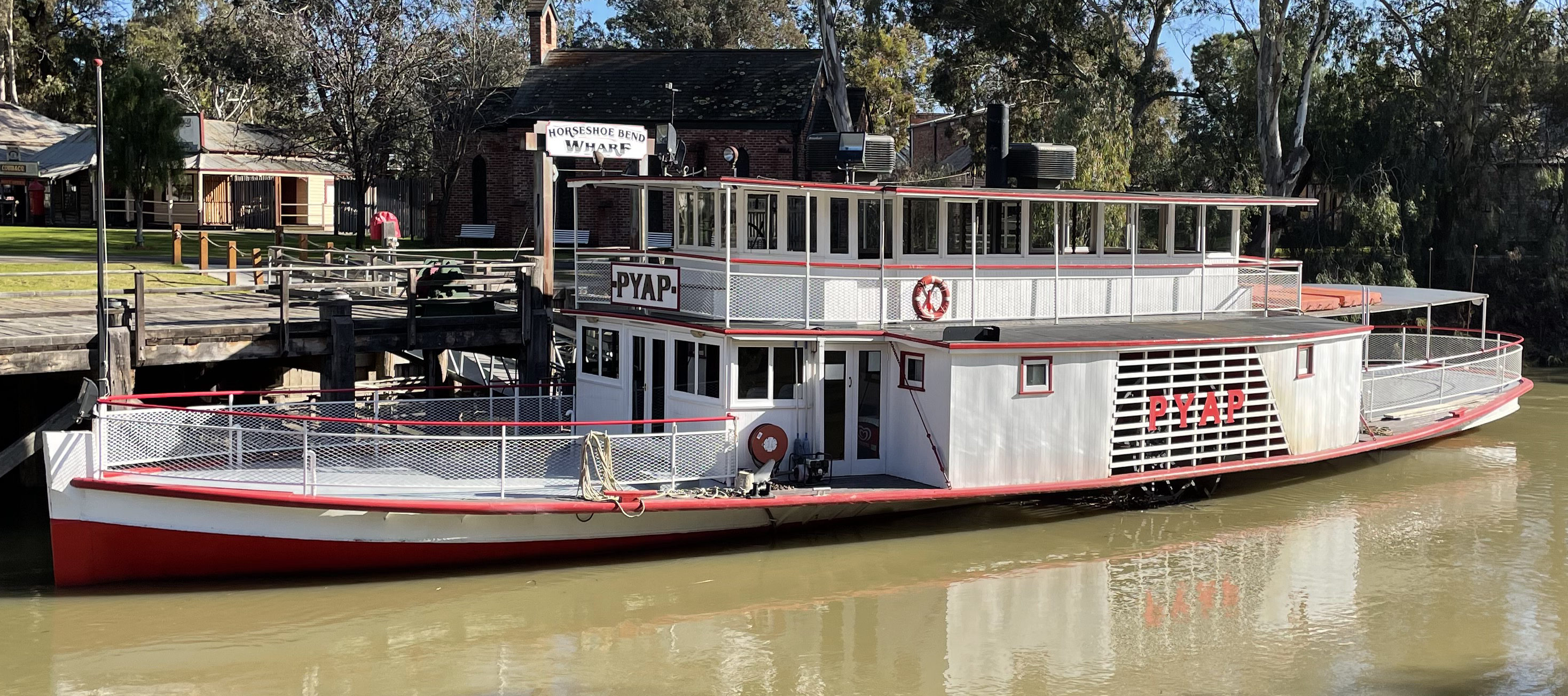
- PV Pyap at the Pioneer Settlement in Swan Hill, Victoria (2021)

History

Australia
- Name: Pyap
- Owner: Capt. C Oliver
- Route: Murray River, Australia
- Builder: Mesers. W Westergarde and Sons
- Launched: 18 July 1896
- Maiden voyage: 21 September 1897
- Homeport: Swan Hill, Victoria (Australia)
- Status: Tourist vessel

General characteristics
- Class & type: Paddle vessel
- Length: 96 ft (29 m)
- Beam: 160 ft (49 m)
- Draught: 3 ft (0.91 m)
- Depth: 4 ft 6 in (1.37 m)
- Propulsion: Side wheel
- Notes: References:

PV Pyap is a tourist paddle vessel operating within Swan Hill's Pioneer Settlement. Originally launched as a barge in July 1896 at Mannum, the Pyap was completed as a paddle steamer in late 1897 and operated on the Murray River. In 1970, the Pyap was purchased by Toby Henson and refitted with a diesel engine, with the intention of relocation to the Pioneer Settlement.

== History ==
=== Construction and early history ===
The Pyap was first launched, built as a barge by Mesers. W Westergarde and Sons, at the Mannum Dry Dock on 18 July 1896. She was constructed with the intention that "should the trade warrant it she [could] at any time be easily converted into a steamer by the addition of the necessary machinery".

By early October 1897 the Pyap had been completed as a paddle steamer, now fitted with a 10-horsepower Marshall & Sons 2-cylinder geared steam engine. She was recorded at this time as being "the lightest draught river steamer afloat on the Murray". She was also advertised as featuring four cabins, a general store on deck, a dining saloon, and "two nice comfortable sleeping berths on the hurricane deck". She left Milang for her maiden voyage on 21 September 1897. She was recorded in mid-October as having collected several loads of wool from Wellington Lodge, Nalpa, and Sir W Jervois' stations.

=== Life as a hawking steamer ===
On 30 September 1899, the Pyap was involved in an incident when a boy, aged 10 years, fell overboard while the vessel was traveling at a rate of five miles per hour (8.0 km/h). Another passenger jumped in and bought the victim to safety.

In June 1901, it was reported that Pyap "ran against sandbanks several times before reaching Morgan".

On 20 August 1908, the vessel met trouble when three miles (4.8 km) from her departure location of Murray Bridge a driving gear broke, rendering her machinery useless. With Captain W Sladden at the helm, a line was fixed to a small gum tree on the adjoining swamp. Due to the strain of the vessel and the wind, the tree was unearthed by its roots, with the paddle steamer continuing at the mercy of the current and wind. Fortunately, a large fallen gum tree arrested the vessel's course, and the only resulting damage was a broken paddle box. The Pyap was steaming again within 12 hours.

It was reported by The Mount Barker Courier and Onkaparinga and Gumeracha Advertiser in 1909 that while under the ownership of Eudunda Co-operative Company, the original steam engine of the Pyap was removed and sold under the recommendation of Captain Oliver. This was replaced with the original engine from the PS Victor; an 1892 Garrett and Sons 16-horsepower, 2-cylinder compound semi-portable steam engine that consumed 10 to 12 tons of wood a day (while steaming an average of 16 hours a day at 8 miles per hour (13 km/h)). In the first 18 months that the Eudunda Co-operative Company owned the Pyap, they spent over £700 on altercations and improvements. She was reported at this time as being a hawking steamer, carrying over £2,000 worth of fresh produce, groceries, and the latest fashion.

During the 1940s, the Pyap was owned and operated by Captain William Grimwood 'Pop' Collins and his wife Amy Collins.

=== Relocation to the Pioneer Settlement ===
PS Pyap was brought to the Pioneer Settlement in Swan Hill in 1970 to be converted to a tourist vessel. Prior to arrival, the Pyap was fitted with a 225 hp GM671 Gray Marine diesel engine, replacing her steam engine (and rendering her a paddle vessel). The vessel sank shortly after arrival, as cracks in her hull had allowed water to seep into the bilge over time. The original timber in the composite hull was replaced with steel, and she resumed operation in 1971.

In February 1977, the Pyap became stranded in mud on the Murray River near Swan Hill when the river level dropped to below 30 centimetres (12 in). Despite efforts made by Captain Ed Hazelman to cut a channel in the mud with a home-made dredge, she remained stranded until a downpour of rain in April 1977 raised the river level sufficiently to refloat the vessel. Following this ordeal, the Pyap returned to working back and forth the 13 kilometres (8.1 mi) of river between Swan Hill and the Murray Downs station.

During 1978, the Pyap was boarded by [Princess Alexandra].

Shortly after, on 27 September 1978, the Pyap caught fire and burnt to the waterline of the vessel. The entire superstructure was replaced over a period of six weeks.

On 18 October 1987, a paddle steamer race was planned in Echuca between the Pyap and the PS Canberra for the Rich River Festival, however the race was cancelled before the event took place.

The Pyap currently operates daily cruises on the Little Murray River (also known as the Marrabor River) at the Pioneer Settlement in Swan Hill.

== Steam engine ==
The 1892 Garrett and Sons 16-horsepower compound steam engine of the Pyap was restored and temporarily re-used on the PV Mundoo when constructed in 1987. Following the purchase of Mundoo on 5 December 1999, she steamed 888 km upstream from Goolwa to Mildura. Due to the faster river nature in Mildura, the original 1892 steam engine from the Pyap was removed from the Mundoo and replaced with a Cummins diesel hydraulic engine, rendering her a paddle vessel.
