= PS Gem =

Side-wheel paddle steamer

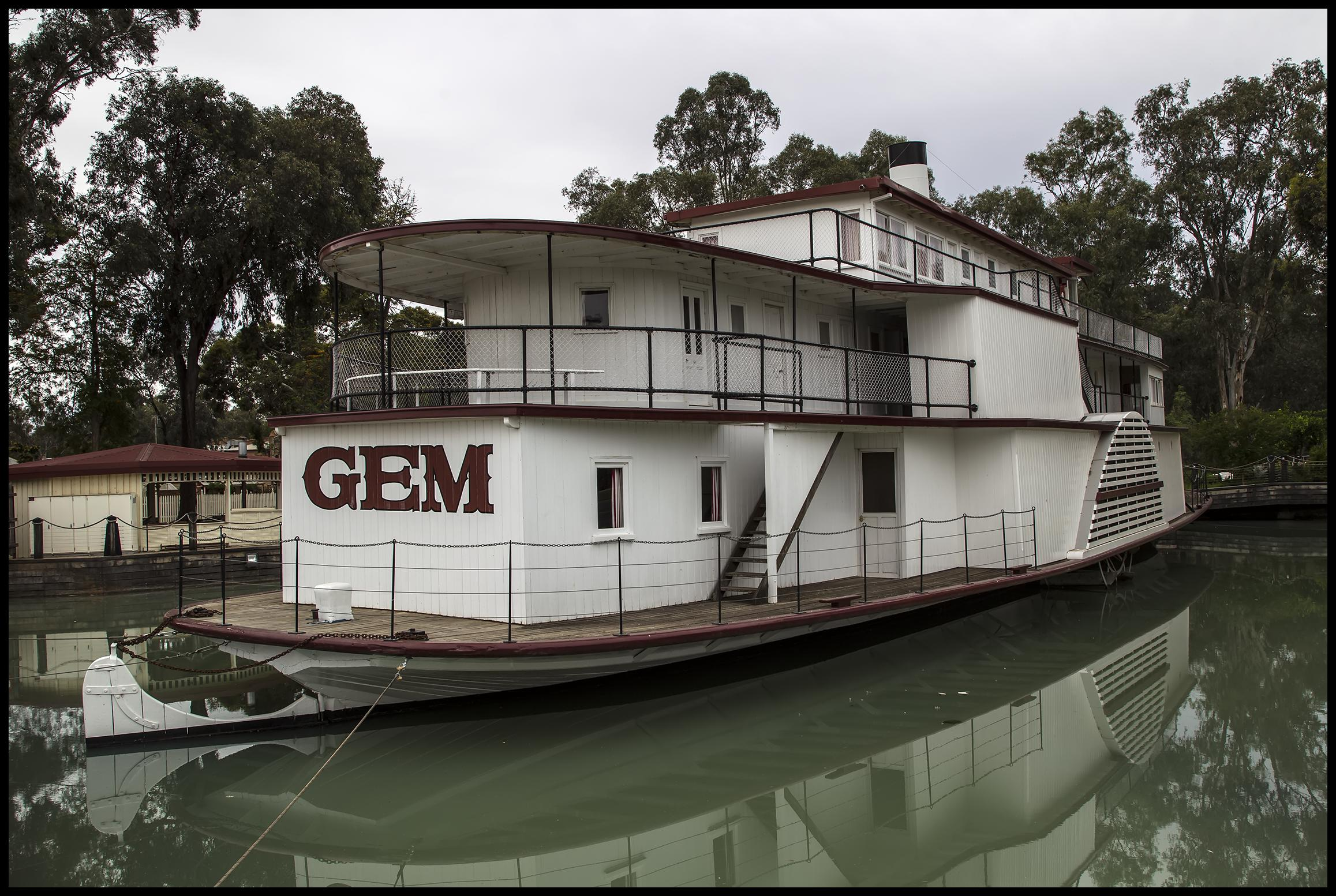
- PS Gem at the Pioneer Settlement in Swan Hill, Victoria (2018)

History

Australia
- Name: Gem
- Owner: E C Randell (first owner)
- Port of registry: Adelaide, South Australia
- Route: Murray River, Australia
- Builder: Air and Westergaard
- Laid down: 1876
- Launched: 1877
- Out of service: 1953
- Refit: 1882
- Home port: Morgan, South Australia
- Nickname(s): The Queen of the Murray
- Status: Static display

General characteristics
- Class & type: Paddle steamer
- Length: 93 ft 4 in (28.45 m) (1877); 133 ft 6 in (40.69 m) (1882)
- Beam: 20 ft 4 in (6.20 m) (1877); 20 ft 7 in (6.27 m) (1882)
- Draught: 4 ft 6 in (1.37 m)
- Depth: 6 ft 7 in (2.01 m) (1877); 6 ft 6 in (1.98 m) (1882)
- Propulsion: Side wheel
- Speed: Upstream: 7.5 knots; Downstream: 11 knots

The PS Gem is a retired side-wheel paddle steamer that was first launched in 1876 on the Murray River at Moama, New South Wales. She operated as a cargo and passenger steamer, regularly cruising between Morgan and Mildura. The Gem operated as a tourist passenger vessel during the 1930s and 1940s, and was retired in the early 1950s. In 1962 the Gem was sold to the then Swan Hill Folk Museum, where it would become a static display and historic monument.

== History ==
=== Launch and early life ===
The Gem was built in 1876 by Air and Westergaard in Moama for Elliot Charles Randell (brother of William Richard Randell, captain of the Mary Ann (1853), the Murray's first paddle steamer). Built of red gum with iron frames, and expected to steam at 15 miles an hour, she was launched on 24 June 1876. The Gem was initially used as a barge, and towed behind the PS Pearl. She made her maiden voyage behind the Pearl on 22 July 1876, leaving Echuca for Hay with a collective 22 tons of cargo and four passengers.

It was reported in early 1877 that the Gem and her sister barge Ruby were to be fitted with steam engines (and additional decking) in Echuca. The Gem was fitted with a 40-horsepower engine built by Davey Bros. of Ballarat, and work was completed on both steamers by 30 January 1877. It was August 1877 before the Gem made her maiden voyage of some 1,063 river miles downstream to Goolwa. She returned on 29 September, with a cargo of 180 cases of wine, before leaving once more on 11 October, this time for Hay. It was reported in December 1877 that the Gem and the Ruby were to soon leave for Goolwa, and due to the falling river were not expected to return until the following season, when the Darling River would begin to fill. When the Gem returned to Echuca the following season, on 27 July 1878, she was offered for sale by public auction. Though the reserve was not met, an invitation for private bids was released, and an announcement was later made that the vessel had been sold to E P Sabine, a South Australian river trader. The Gem left Echuca for the Lower Murray on 25 September, never to return.

=== Life on the Lower Murray ===
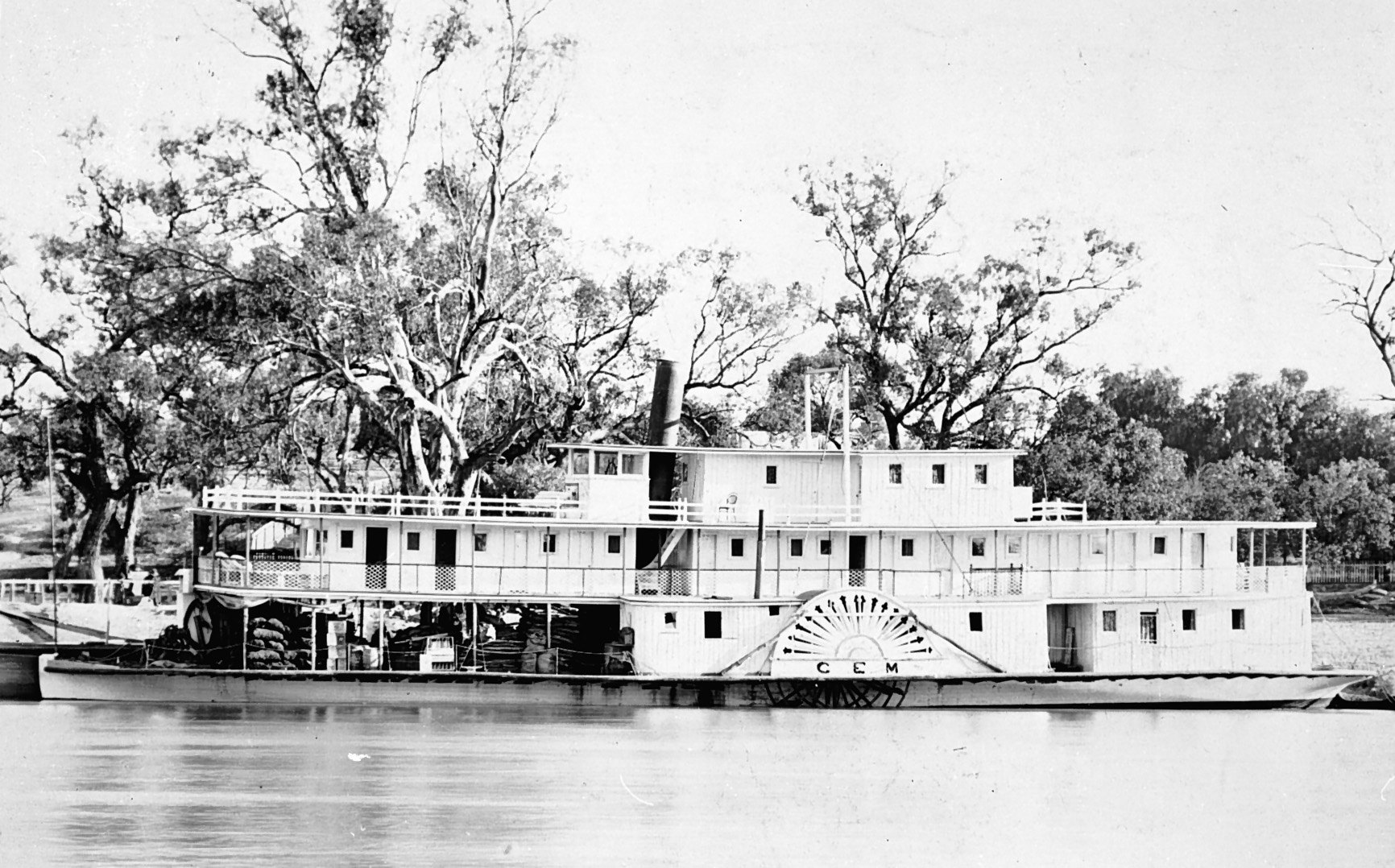
The PS Gem on the Murray River (c 1900)

The Gem arrived at Wentworth on 30 September 1878, and proceeded to travel regularly between there and Blanchetown. This route was adjusted by January 1879, the Gem then offering a regular service between Wentworth and Morgan (where the railway line from Adelaide had recently opened). The ownership of the Gem was transferred in April 1879 to Captain Hugh King (later known as 'The Grand Old Man of the River'), with whom a fortnightly trip from Wentworth to Wilcannia by the Darling River was introduced. King and fellow owners W L Reid and R T Reid, trading as Hugh King and Company's Line of River Steamers, felt that the vessel had the potential to be a fine, large passenger steamer, though alterations would be necessary. By 10 February 1882, the Gem had reportedly passed through Mannum on her way to Goolwa, where she would "be cut in two and forty feet more in length put into her, which... [would] make her of a very much lighter draught". Upon arriving at yards of W Gordon and Son, the Gem was cut in half, with each end being dragged apart by bullock teams. With the addition forty feet added to the centre, the new length of the vessel was 133 ft 6 in (40.69 m). During this transformation, full passenger accommodation was also added.

When the Gem was relaunched on 22 June 1882, she became the longest paddle steamer on the Murray River. The vessel returned to her regularly route between Morgan and Wentworth, though this was extended in 1888 following the establishment of the settlement of Mildura. She was able to offer this service only from June to December, remaining laid up due to low river levels for the remainder of the year. During Captain King's time at the helm of the vessel, the Gem suffered no serious accidents.

In November 1888, the Gem was acquired by a partnership of Captain King and C Chaffey, who a month later formed the River Murray Navigation Company. The Gem joined a fleet including its sister Ruby, the PS Ellen, and other paddle steamers. Under this new ownership, the Gem continued her regular cruising between Morgan, Wentworth and Mildura. Though essentially a passenger vessel, the paddle steamer still shared in the carriage of goods. In August 1895, the Gem was carrying an average of 200 bales of wool per trip between rural stations and the rail head at Morgan. In 1895 The River Murray Navigation Company went in to liquidation, leaving King the Gem's sole owner. In late December 1903, the Gem suffered an accident when the rudder chain jammed, resulting in the vessel running at full speed into a gum tree on the Victorian bank. A portion of the guard rails and houses on the port side were damaged, though no one was injured.

=== Early 20th century ===
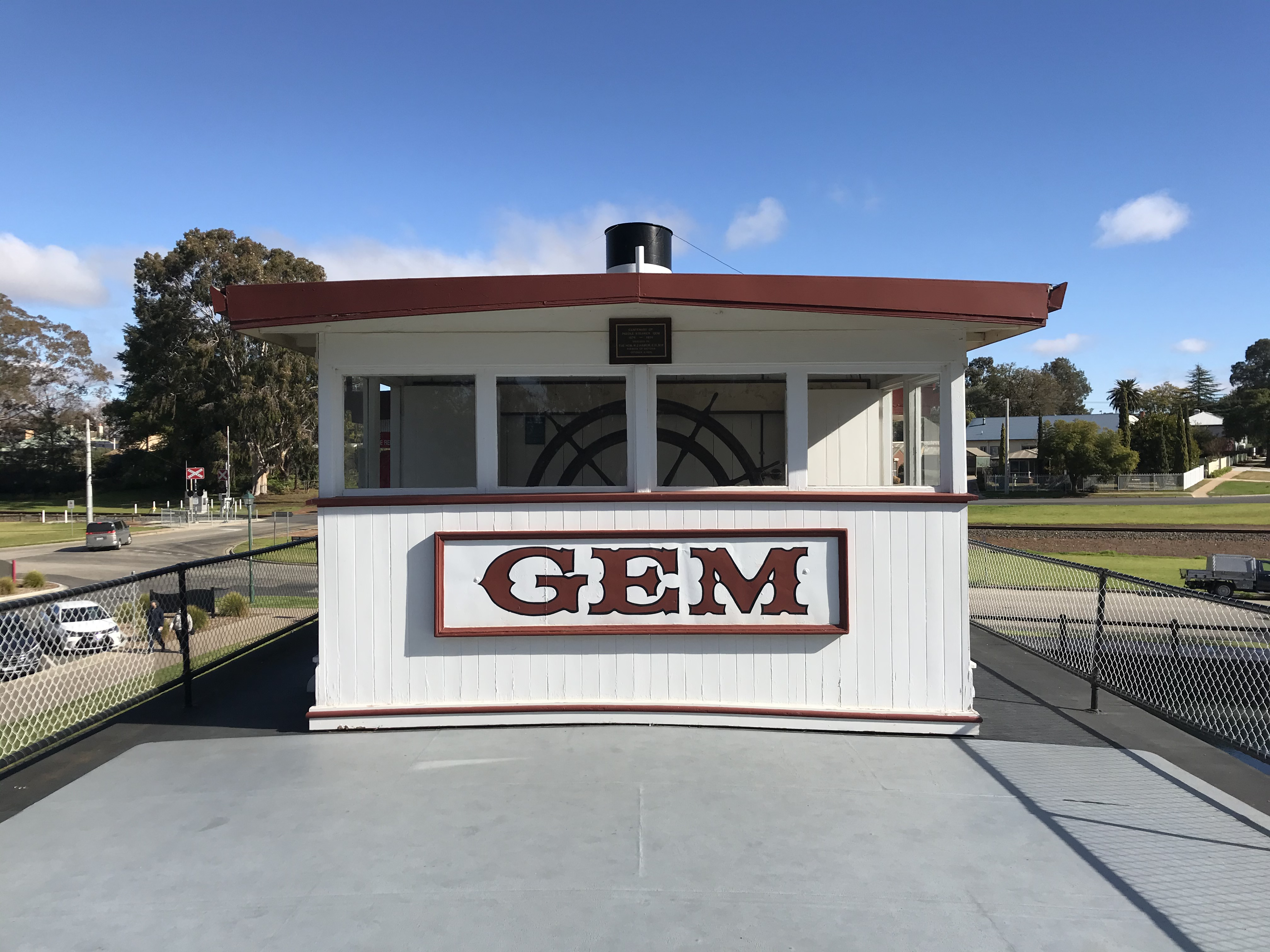
Wheelehouse of the PS Gem, restored at the Pioneer Settlement (July 2021)

During a visit to Mildura in October 1909, Sir Thomas Gibson-Carmichael (the Governor of Victoria) travelled aboard the PS Gem. On the morning of October 20, the Governor and a party of fifty to sixty boarded the Gem, visiting the junction of the Murray and Darling Rivers, before continuing to Wentworth. Upon arrival at 2 o'clock, they were met by mayor W Atkinson and visited a local primary school before returning to Mildura by drays.

Toward the end of 1909, the Gem Navigation Company was formed of King's Gem Line of Steamers and the Ben Chaffey Steamboat Company, with the Gem joining a company of fourteen steamers and twenty barges. During most of the 1914–15 season the river level was low. The Gem, having returned to the water from a regular overhaul on the Goolwa slip, spent most of the season berthed. During this time, motor transport passenger services became more common and, due to the low river level, more reliable. The Gem Navigation Company was one of several that, in an effort to sustain the declining river traffic, amalgamated in 1919 to become the Murray Shipping Company. Of the company's fleet, the PS Corowa was withdrawn from service in 1920, the PS Ellen in 1925, and the PS Ruby in 1928, leaving only the PS Gem and the PS Marion to continue the passenger service.

During the 1930s and 1940s, the Gem acted as a tourist passenger vessel, regularly undertaking the 352-mile (566 km) river journey from Morgan to Mildura. The Gem would travel day and night, offering guests the chance to view the Murray River under starlight. The paddle steamer boasted modern conveniences including hot and cold baths, electric lights and large cabins, as well as a first-class menu that included freshly caught Murray cod. The Gem also hosted a dining saloon, complete with fine crystal and silver.

=== Later life ===
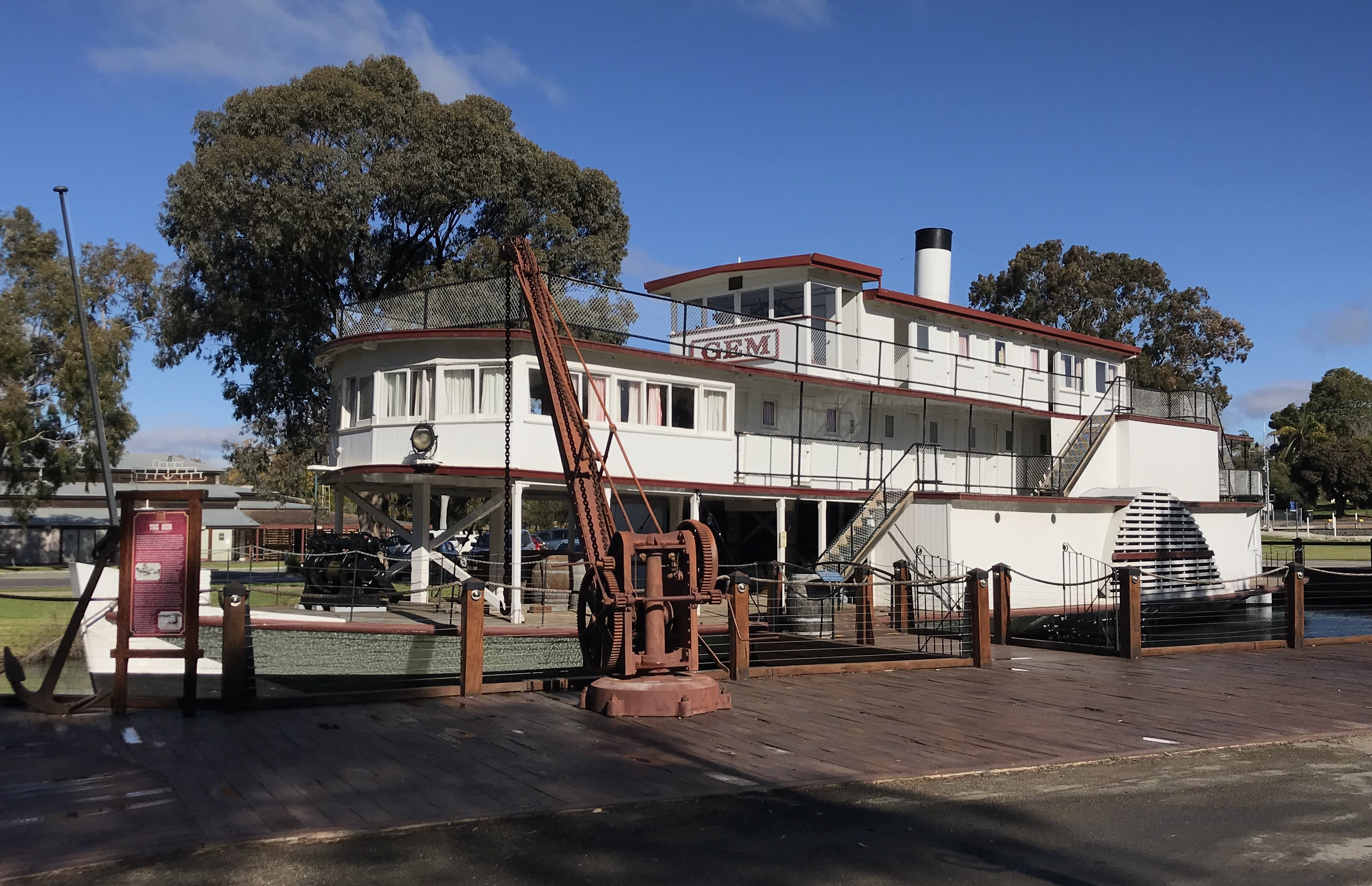
The PS Gem at the Pioneer Settlement (2021)

On 6 November 1948, the Gem struck a snag near Cal Lal, New South Wales, resulting in a break of the planking of the forward hold on the port side. Captain G Makin navigated the vessel toward the Victorian bank, where she sunk in 15 feet of water. A line was run to a nearby tree to prevent the vessel slipping further into the water. The boat's dinghy was used to ferry passengers to the New South Wales bank, and the nearby Kilcurna Station lent their boat to assist in the removal of passengers. Of the sixty passengers aboard, only one perished. C M Smith, aged 73, was found in his cabin having died of shock (he was said to have "been convalescing"). The damage to the Gem was not found to be excessive; her stern was slightly damaged and the hole in her side was eighteen by nine inches in size. The vessel was hauled onto dry land on the Victorian bank for repairs, and she was refloated on 20 November. She was unable to travel under her own steam, and was towed to Mildura for repairs. The repairs were finally completed by September 1949, at a cost of £3000.

The Gem was inspected and recommissioned, sailing from Mildura downstream on 26 September 1949. Despite this, regular services soon ceased, and then end for the Gem came when the Murray Shipping Company went into liquidation in 1952. After changing hands twice, the Gem was purchased by A H Wilkins, who had her taken on her final voyage under her own steam from Morgan to Mildura. Here she remained tied up below Lock 11. In 1962 the Gem was sold to the Swan Hill Folk Museum (now the Pioneer Settlement) for £4000. She left Mildura for the last time on 1 October 1962, towed by the PS Oscar W. The journey was initially expected to take only ten days; however, due to the low state of the river the vessels were help up, the resulting journey taking nine months. The Gem now rests within a dam at the Pioneer Settlement, without an engine. She's had a range of uses since arrival, including being used as an art gallery, museum office, caretaker's flat and Australia's first bush-tucker restaurant. In more recent years, the Gem has been completely restored with fresh paint and upgrades, including the removal of all the art gallery and restaurant fittings.

== Modern day ==
Both the engine and boiler of the PS Gem were sold for scrap in 1956, with the remaining empty space being filled with equivalent weight ensuring the vessel's flotation at correct angles and depth. Prior to removal, the PS Gem featured a static Tangye steam engine as an unused example of its prior power.

In 2023, the Pioneer Settlement celebrated the 60th anniversary of the paddlesteamer's arrival to Swan Hill. A temporary exhibition aboard the vessel was launched, while a 13-minute audio-visual presentation documenting her final journey was projected upon the side of the vessel during evenings in July and August.
