= Pioneer Settlement =

Open-air museum in Australia

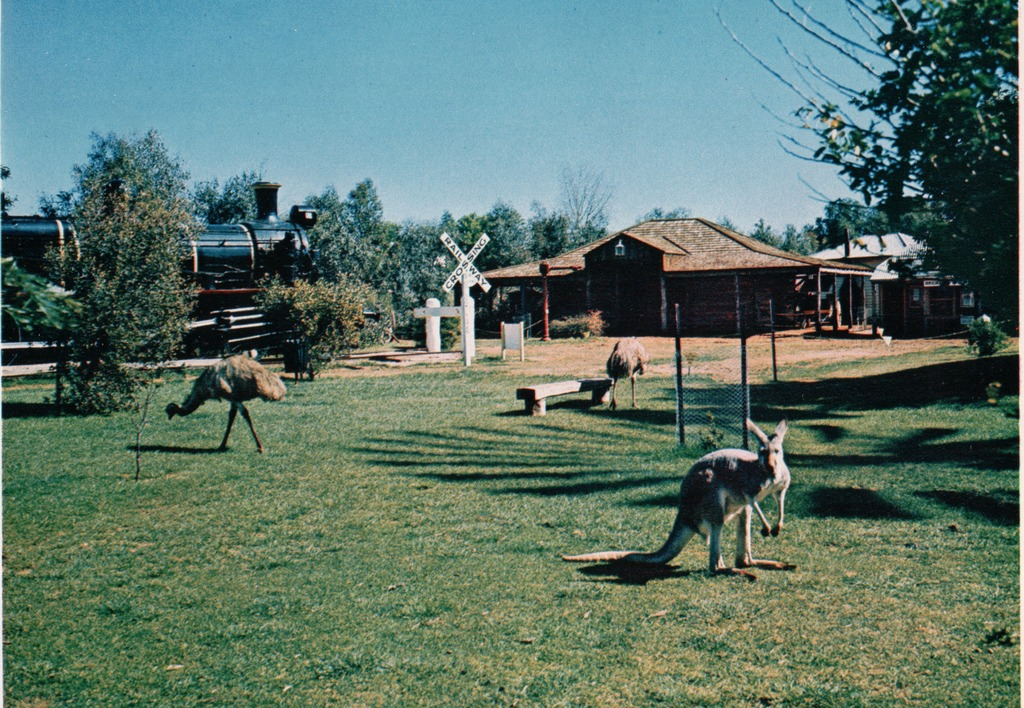

Swan Hill, Victoria
- Coordinates: 35°20′53″S 143°33′54″E
- Status: Operating
- Opening date: 1966

The Pioneer Settlement, in Swan Hill, Victoria, is Australia's first open-air museum, portraying life on the Murray in the era 1830-1930. It opened in 1966 as the Swan Hill Folk Museum, before being renamed, following a visit by the Queen in 1970. It contains approximately 50 replica buildings, including Masonic hall, coach-house, post office, photographic studio, original 1895 kaiserpanorama, and newspaper office. The collection also contains numerous tractors – including the first tractor ever brought to Australia – and historic vehicles, and two 19th-century riverboats, including the 1876 paddlesteamer PS Gem. This vessel was towed to the site in 1963, and is now a static display.

The PS Gem was towed by the PS Oscar W to the Pioneer Settlement in 1962 following her sale for £4,000 to the Swan Hill Folk Museum. She now exists as a static display within the compound.) The PV Pyap operates daily cruises from the Horseshoe Bend Wharf within the settlement. Original built in Mannum as a barge in 1896, the Pyap was converted to a paddle steamer by October 1897. Prior to relocation to the Pioneer Settlement in 1970, the Pyap was refitted with a 225 hp GM671 Gray Marine diesel engine.

The Swan Hill Pioneer Settlement Authority (Repeal) Act 1994 (No. 46 of 1994) brought the settlement under the control of the Swan Hill City Council.
