= List of acts of the Parliament of Victoria from 1898 =

This is a list of acts of the Parliament of Victoria, Australia for the year 1898.

== 1898 ==
Short title, or popular name	Citation	Royal assent
Long title
Assistant Government Statist's Act 1898 (repealed)	62 Vict. No. 1543	26 July 1898
An Act relating to the Office of Assistant Government Statist. (Repealed by Statistics Act 1915 (6 Geo. V. No. 2730))
Insolvency Act 1898 (repealed)	62 Vict. No. 1544	26 July 1898
An Act to amend Section 118 of the Insolvency Act 1897. (Note: Insolvency Act 1897 (61 Vict. No. 1513)) (Repealed by Insolvency Act 1915 (6 Geo. V. No. 2671))
Flemington and Kensington Loan Act 1898	62 Vict. No. 1545	26 July 1898
An Act to authorize the Borough of Flemington and Kensington to construct certain permanent Works and Undertakings in lieu of certain other permanent Works and Undertakings.
Municipalities' Deposit Receipts Sale Act 1898 (repealed)	62 Vict. No. 1546	26 July 1898
An Act to enable Municipalities to sell Deposit Receipts Stocks and Shares. (Repealed by Local Government Act 1903 (3 Edw. VII. No. 1893))
	62 Vict. No. 1547	26 July 1898
An Act to apply out of the Consolidated Revenue the sum of One million three hundred and six thousand eight hundred and ninety-four pounds to the service of the year One thousand eight hundred and ninety-eight and ninety-nine.
	62 Vict. No. 1548	10 August 1898
An Act to apply out of the Consolidated Revenue the sum of One hundred and forty-six thousand nine hundred and three pounds to the service of the year One thousand eight hundred and ninety-seven and ninety-eight.
Fern Tree Gully and Gembrook Railway Construction Act 1898	62 Vict. No. 1549	15 August 1898
An Act to authorize the construction by the State of a Line of Railway from Fern Tree Gully to Gembrook.
Birchip and Cronomby Railway Construction Act 1898	62 Vict. No. 1550	15 August 1898
An Act to authorize the construction by the State of a Line of Railway from Birchip to Cronomby.
Brighton Loan Act 1898	62 Vict. No. 1551	15 August 1898
An Act to authorize the Town of Brighton to construct certain permanent Works and Undertakings in lieu of certain other permanent Works and Undertakings.
Municipalities' Loans Extension Act 1898	62 Vict. No. 1552	25 August 1898
An Act to enable Municipalities to extend the period during which they have to provide for the Payment of Loans.
Licensing Fund Act 1898	62 Vict. No. 1553	25 August 1898
An Act to transfer a portion of "The Licensing Act 1885 Fund" to the Consolidated Revenue and for other purposes.
Evidence Act 1898 (repealed)	62 Vict. No. 1554	21 September 1898
An Act to facilitate the Proof of Acts of the Parliaments of Australasian Colonies and of Judicial and Official Documents Seals and Signatures and for other purposes. (Repealed by Evidence Act 1915 (6 Geo. V. No. 2647))
Quambatook and Ultima Railway Construction Act 1898	62 Vict. No. 1555	21 September 1898
An Act to authorize the construction by the State of a Line of Railway from Quambatook to Ultima.
Maffra Beet Sugar Company Limited Further Advance Act 1898	62 Vict. No. 1556	21 September 1898
An Act to provide for a further Advance to the Maffra Beet Sugar Company Limited and for other purposes.
Marine Act 1897 (Note: Although passed in 1897, and given a short title ending '...Act 1897', the need to obtain approval for this act from the United Kingdom meant it was proclaimed until the year 1898.) (repealed)	62 Vict. No. 1557	9 September 1898 (Note: This act was reserved for approval by Her Majesty.)
An Act to further amend the Marine Act 1890. (Note: Marine Act 1890 (54 Vict. No. 1165)) (Repealed by Marine Act 1915 (6 Geo. V. No. 2688))
Jeparit towards Albacutya Railway Construction Act 1898	62 Vict. No. 1558	19 October 1898
An Act to authorize the construction by the State of a Line of Railway from Jeparit towards Albacutya.
Stock Debentures and Bonds Limitation Act 1898	62 Vict. No. 1559	19 October 1898
An Act to limit the issue of certain Government Stock Debentures and Bonds.
Victorian Government Consolidated Inscribed Stock Act 1898 (repealed)	62 Vict. No. 1560	19 October 1898
An Act to provide for the creation and issue of Victorian Government Consolidated Inscribed Stock and for converting the public debt of Victoria into such Stock. (Repealed by Treasury Legislation (Repeal) Act 2005 (No. 73 of 2005))
Victorian Government Consolidated Inscribed Stock Redemption Fund Act 1898 (repealed)	62 Vict. No. 1561	19 October 1898
An Act to establish a Victorian Government Consolidated Inscribed Stock Redemption Fund. (Repealed by Treasury Legislation (Repeal) Act 2005 (No. 73 of 2005))
Victorian Government Loan Act 1898	62 Vict. No. 1562	19 October 1898
An Act to authorize the raising of Money for Railways and Irrigation Works and Water Supply.
Railway Loan Application Act 1898	62 Vict. No. 1563	19 October 1898
An Act to authorize the Expenditure of certain sums of Money available under Loan Acts for Railways.
Victorian Government Three per cent. Stock Act 1898 (repealed)	62 Vict. No. 1564	19 October 1898
An Act to authorize the raising of money for certain purposes by increasing the amount of Victorian Government Three per cent. Stock. (Repealed by Treasury Legislation (Repeal) Act 2005 (No. 73 of 2005))
Victorian Loans Redemption Fund Act 1898 (repealed)	62 Vict. No. 1565	19 October 1898
An Act to establish a Victorian Loans Redemption Fund and for other purposes. (Repealed by Statute Law Revision Act 1995 (No. 11 of 1995))
Railway and Public Works Loan Application Act 1898	62 Vict. No. 1566	19 October 1898
An Act to authorize the Expenditure of certain Sums of Money available under Loan Acts for Railway Works Public Works and other purposes.
Municipalities' Advances Act 1898	62 Vict. No. 1567	19 October 1898
An Act to authorize Advances to be made to certain Municipalities.
Mining Development Act 1898 (repealed)	62 Vict. No. 1568	19 October 1898
An Act to amend the Mining Development Act 1896. (Note: Mining Development Act 1896 (60 Vict. No. 1461)) (Repealed by Mining Development Act 1915 (6 Geo. V. No. 2699))
Pilots' Advance Repayment Act 1898 (repealed)	62 Vict. No. 1569	19 October 1898
An Act to authorize certain Deductions to be made out of Moneys payable to Pilots. (Repealed by Statute Law Revision Act 1995 (No. 11 of 1995))
	62 Vict. No. 1570	26 October 1898
An Act to apply out of the Consolidated Revenue the sum of One million one hundred and eighteen thousand six hundred and twelve pounds to the service of the year One thousand eight hundred and ninety-eight and ninety-nine.
Electric Light and Power Act 1898 (repealed)	62 Vict. No. 1571	5 December 1898
An Act to amend the Electric Light and Power Act 1896. (Note: Electric Light and Power Act 1896 (59 Vict. No. 1413)) (Repealed by Electric Light and Power Act 1915 (6 Geo. V. No. 2645))
British Pharmacopœia Act 1898 or the British Pharmacopoeia Act 1898 (repealed)	62 Vict. No. 1572	5 December 1898
An Act to provide for the adoption of the British Pharmacopœia. (Repealed by Medical Act 1915 (6 Geo. V. No. 2695))
Wages Attachment Act 1898	62 Vict. No. 1573	5 December 1898
An Act to regulate Attachment of Wages.
Treasury Bonds Act 1898	62 Vict. No. 1574	5 December 1898
An Act to authorize the Issue of Treasury Bonds.
Treasury Bonds Act 1898 No. 2	62 Vict. No. 1575	5 December 1898
An Act to authorize the Issue of Treasury Bonds. (No. 2.)
Mildura Crown Grants Act 1898 (repealed)	62 Vict. No. 1576	5 December 1898
An Act to authorize the issuing of Crown Grants of certain Lands at Mildura. (Repealed by Statute Law Revision Act 1984 (No. 10087))
Melbourne Electric Lighting Loan Act 1898	62 Vict. No. 1577	5 December 1898
An Act to enable the Mayor Aldermen Councillors and Citizens of the City of Melbourne to raise a further sum or sums of money not exceeding Two hundred and fifty thousand pounds and for other purposes.
Vine Disease Act 1898 (repealed)	62 Vict. No. 1578	5 December 1898
An Act to amend the Vine Disease Act 1890. (Note: Vine Disease Act 1890 (54 Vict. No. 1155)) (Repealed by Vegetation and Vine Diseases Act 1915 (6 Geo. V. No. 2744))
Railways Standing Committee Act 1898 (repealed)	62 Vict. No. 1579	5 December 1898
An Act to provide for the Remuneration of the Parliamentary Standing Committee on Railways. (Repealed by Railways Standing Committee Act 1915 (6 Geo. V. No. 2717))
Municipal Overdrafts (Indemnity) Act 1898	62 Vict. No. 1580	5 December 1898
An Act to indemnify the Councillors of various Municipalities for Borrowing Moneys by Overdrafts on Bankers for the purposes of their Municipalities contrary to the provisions of the Local Government Act 1890. (Note: Local Government Act 1890 (54 Vict. No. 1112))
Employers and Employés Act 1890 Further Continuation Act 1898 or the Employers and Employees Act 1890 Further Continuation Act 1898 (repealed)	62 Vict. No. 1581	19 December 1898
An Act to further continue in force Part III. of the Employers and Employés Act 1890. (Note: Employers and Employés Act 1890 (54 Vict. No. 1087)) (Repealed by Employers and Employés Act 1915 (6 Geo. V. No. 2646))
Marriage Act 1898 (repealed)	62 Vict. No. 1582	19 December 1898
An Act to further amend the law relating to Marriage. (Repealed by Marriage Act 1915 (6 Geo. V. No. 2691))
Drainage Areas Act 1898 (repealed)	62 Vict. No. 1583	19 December 1898
An Act to provide for the Drainage of Land. (Repealed by Drainage Areas Act 1915 (6 Geo. V. No. 2642))
Justices Act 1898 (repealed)	62 Vict. No. 1584	19 December 1898
An Act to amend the Justices Act 1890. (Note: Justices Act 1890 (54 Vict. No. 1105)) (Repealed by Justices Act 1915 (6 Geo. V. No. 2675))
Public Service Act 1898 (repealed)	62 Vict. No. 1585	19 December 1898
An Act to authorize the Transfer of certain Employés from the Railway Service to the Public Service. (Repealed by Public Service Act 1915 (6 Geo. V. No. 2713))
Railway and Public Works Loan Application Act 1898 (No. 2)	62 Vict. No. 1586	19 December 1898
An Act to amend the Railway and Public Works Loan Application Act 1898. (Note: Railway and Public Works Loan Application Act 1898 (62 Vict. No. 1566))
Teachers Act 1898 (repealed)	62 Vict. No. 1587	19 December 1898
An Act relating to unclassified State School Teachers. (Repealed by Public Service Act 1915 (6 Geo. V. No. 2713))
Water Supply Loans Application Act 1898	62 Vict. No. 1588	19 December 1898
An Act to sanction the issue and application of certain sums of money as Loans for Water Supply and Irrigation Works in the Country Districts and for other purposes.
Lilydale and Warburton Railway Construction Act 1898	62 Vict. No. 1589	19 December 1898
An Act to authorize the construction by the State of a Line of Railway from Lilydale to Warburton.
Melbourne to Collingwood Railway Construction Act 1898	62 Vict. No. 1590	19 December 1898
An Act to authorize the construction by the State of a direct Line of Railway from Melbourne to Collingwood.
Exported Products Act 1898 (repealed)	62 Vict. No. 1591	19 December 1898
An Act to provide for the Inspection of Live Stock, Meat, Dairy Produce, Fruit, and other products intended for Export and to regulate the Exportation thereof. (Repealed by Export Products Act 1915 (6 Geo. V. No. 2649))
Income Tax Act 1898 (repealed)	62 Vict. No. 1592	19 December 1898
An Act to continue the Income Tax Acts for the Year ending on the thirty-first day of December One thousand eight hundred and ninety-nine and to declare the Rates of Duties thereunder. (Repealed by Income Tax Act 1915 (6 Geo. V. No. 2668))
Registration of Births Deaths and Marriages Act 1898 (repealed)	62 Vict. No. 1593	19 December 1898
An Act to amend the Registration of Births Deaths and Marriages Act 1890. (Note: Registration of Births Deaths and Marriages Act 1890 (54 Vict. No. 1137)) (Repealed by Registration of Births Deaths and Marriages Act 1915 (6 Geo. V. No. 2720))
Colac and Beech Forest Railway Construction Act 1898	62 Vict. No. 1594	19 December 1898
An Act to authorize the construction by the State of a Line of Railway from Colac to Beech Forest.
Dentists Act 1898 (repealed)	62 Vict. No. 1595	20 December 1898
An Act to amend the law relating to Dentists. (Repealed by Medical Act 1915 (6 Geo. V. No. 2695))
Railway Lands Acquisition Act 1898 (repealed)	62 Vict. No. 1596	20 December 1898
An Act to amend the Railway Lands Acquisition Act 1893. (Note: Railway Lands Acquisition Act 1893 (56 Vict. No. 1288)) (Repealed by Railway Lands Acquisition Act 1915 (6 Geo. V. No. 2715))
Factories and Shops Act 1898 (repealed)	62 Vict. No. 1597	20 December 1898
An Act to further amend the Factories and Shops Acts. (Repealed by Factories and Shops Act 1905 (5 Edw. VII. No. 1975))
Auction Sales Act 1898 (repealed)	62 Vict. No. 1598	20 December 1898
An Act to amend the Auction Sales Act 1890. (Note: Auction Sales Act 1890 (54 Vict. No. 1065)) (Repealed by Auction Sales Act 1915 (6 Geo. V. No. 2615))
Administration and Probate Act 1898 (repealed)	62 Vict. No. 1599	20 December 1898
An Act to amend the Administration and Probate Acts. (Repealed by Administration and Probate Act 1915 (6 Geo. V. No. 2611))
	62 Vict. No. 1600	20 December 1898
An Act to apply a sum out of the Consolidated Revenue to the service of the year ending on the thirtieth day of June One thousand eight hundred and ninety-nine and to appropriate the Supplies granted in this Session of Parliament.
Constitution Act Amendment Act 1898	62 Vict. No. 1601	20 December 1898
An Act relating to the Purification of the Electoral Rolls for the Legislative Assembly and for other purposes.
Land Act 1898 (repealed)	62 Vict. No. 1602	20 December 1898
An Act to further amend the Land Acts and for other purposes. (Repealed by Land Act 1901 (1 Edw. VII. No. 1749))

== Sources ==
- "1898 Victorian Historical Acts". AustLII.
