= List of acts of the Parliament of Victoria from 1915 =

This is a list of acts of the Parliament of Victoria, Australia for the year 1915.

== 1915 ==
Short title, or popular name	Citation	Royal assent
Long title
Officials in Parliament Act 1914 (Note: Although passed in 1914, and given a short title ending '...Act 1914', the need to obtain approval for this act from the United Kingdom meant it was proclaimed in the year 1915.) (repealed)	5 Geo. V. No. 2578	10 February 1915 (Note: This act was reserved for approval by His Majesty.)
An Act to amend the Law relating to Officials in Parliament. (Repealed by Constitution Act Amendment Act 1915 (6 Geo. V. No. 2632))
Foodstuffs and Commodities Act 1915	5 Geo. V. No. 2579	30 April 1915
An Act to continue the Foodstuffs and Commodities Acts.
Price of Goods Act 1915	6 Geo. V. No. 2580	30 April 1915
An Act to continue the Price of Goods Act 1914 (Note: Price of Goods Act 1914 (5 Geo. V. No. 2516)) and the Price of Goods Act 1914 (No. 2) (Note: Price of Goods Act 1914 (No. 2) (5 Geo. V. No. 2577)) and to repeal Section Two of the last-mentioned Act.
Medical Act 1890 Amendment Act 1915 or the Graduates in Medicine Act 1915	6 Geo. V. No. 2581	15 June 1915
An Act relating to certain Graduates in Medicine and Surgery who are on War Service.
Trusts Act 1891 Amendment Act 1915 or the Trusts Act 1915 (No. 2)	6 Geo. V. No. 2582	22 June 1915
An Act to repeal Section seventeen of the Trusts Act 1891. (Note: Trusts Act 1891 (55 Vict. No. 1228); this was amended by the Sessional Acts Revision Act 1915 (6 Geo. V. No. 2763) to a reference to the Trusts Act 1915 (6 Geo. V. No. 2741))
Articled Law Clerks Act 1915	6 Geo. V. No. 2583	6 July 1915
An Act to enable Articled Law Clerks to reckon Service in connexion with the present War as Service under Articles of Clerkship.
Intoxicating Liquor (Temporary Restriction) Act 1915	6 Geo. V. No. 2584	6 July 1915
An Act to restrict the Sale or Consumption of Intoxicating Liquor during the Present War.
Railways Advances Act 1915	6 Geo. V. No. 2585	6 July 1915
An Act to authorize the Temporary Application out of "The Public Account" of certain Moneys for the purpose of substituting Heavy Rails for Light Rails on certain Lines of Railway.
Dandenong Land Act 1915	6 Geo. V. No. 2586	6 July 1915
An Act to revoke the Permanent Reservation of Portion of certain Land situate in the Town of Dandenong as a Site for a Public Park.
Albert Park Land Act 1915	6 Geo. V. No. 2587	6 July 1915
An Act to revoke the Permanent Reservation and Crown Grant of Portion of certain Land situate in the Municipal Districts of the City of South Melbourne and the City of St. Kilda as a Site for a Public Park.
Footscray Land Act 1915	6 Geo. V. No. 2588	6 July 1915
An Act to revoke the Permanent Reservation and Crown Grant of Portion of certain Land situate in the City of Footscray as a Site for Public Purposes and for a Public Park and Gardens.
	6 Geo. V. No. 2589	6 July 1915
An Act to apply out of the Consolidated Revenue the sum of Two millions five hundred and forty-seven thousand four hundred and thirty-two pounds to the service of the year One thousand nine hundred and fifteen and One thousand nine hundred and sixteen.
Supreme Court Act 1890 Amendment Act 1915 or the Supreme Court Act 1915 (No. 2) (repealed)	6 Geo. V. No. 2590	3 August 1915
An Act to further amend the Supreme Court Act 1890. (Note: Supreme Court Act 1890 (54 Vict. No. 1142);this was amended by the Sessional Acts Revision Act 1915 (6 Geo. V. No. 2763) to a reference to the Supreme Court Act 1915 (6 Geo. V. No. 2733)) (Repealed by Supreme Court Act 1928 (19 Geo. V. No. 3783))
Municipal Loans Act 1915	6 Geo. V. No. 2591	3 August 1915
An Act to provide for Special Loans by the Treasurer of Victoria to Municipalities.
Fitzroy Northcote and Preston Tramways Act 1915	6 Geo. V. No. 2592	3 August 1915
An Act to provide for the Construction and Management of certain Tramways in the Municipal Districts of Fitzroy Northcote and Preston and for other purposes.
Unauthorized Documents Act 1915	6 Geo. V. No. 2593	3 August 1915
An Act relating to the Unauthorized Use of the Royal or other Arms and to the Issue of False or Misleading Process and other Documents.
Geelong Land Act 1915	6 Geo. V. No. 2594	3 August 1915
An Act to authorize the Geelong Harbor Trust Commissioners to convey certain Land and to grant an Easement of Carriage-way appurtenant thereto over certain other Land as a Gift for Defence Purposes to the Commonwealth of Australia and for other purposes.
Execution of Trusts Act 1915	6 Geo. V. No. 2595	10 August 1915
An Act to facilitate the Execution of Trusts dining the Present War.
River Murray Waters Act 1915	6 Geo. V. No. 2596	17 August 1915
An Act to ratify and provide for carrying out an Agreement entered into between the Prime Minister of the Commonwealth of Australia and the Premiers of the States of New South Wales, Victoria, and South Australia, respecting the River Murray and Lake Victoria and other Waters and for other purposes.
	6 Geo. V. No. 2597	17 August 1915
An Act to apply out of the Consolidated Revenue the sum of Four hundred and seventy-four thousand seven hundred and eighty-nine pounds to the service of the year One thousand nine hundred and fourteen and One thousand nine hundred and fifteen.
Seed Advances Act 1915	6 Geo. V. No. 2598	17 August 1915
An Act to amend the Seed Advances Act 1914. (Note: Seed Advances Act 1914 (5 Geo. V. No. 2658))
Savings Banks Acts Amendment Act 1915 or the State Savings Bank Act 1915 (No. 2) (repealed)	6 Geo. V. No. 2599	24 August 1915
An Act to authorize the Commissioners of the State Savings Bank of Victoria to invest in Stock and other Securities issued pursuant to the Act of the Parliament of the Commonwealth of Australia called the War Loan Act (No. 1) 1915. (Note: War Loan Act (No. 1) 1915 (No. 21 (Cth))) (Repealed by State Savings Bank Act 1928 (19 Geo. V. No. 3777))
Mental Treatment Act 1915	6 Geo. V. No. 2600	28 August 1915
An Act to facilitate the Treatment of Mental Disorder of recent Origin arising from Wounds Shock and other Causes.
Trusts Acts Amendment Act 1915 or the Trusts Act 1915 (No. 3)	6 Geo. V. No. 2601	28 August 1915
An Act to authorize Trustees to invest in Stock and other Securities issued pursuant to the Act of the Parliament of the Commonwealth of Australia intituled the War Loan Act (No. 1) 1915.
Friendly Societies Acts Amendment Act 1915 or the Friendly Societies Act 1915 (No. 2)	6 Geo. V. No. 2602	6 September 1915
An Act to amend the Friendly Societies Acts. (Note: This was amended by the Sessional Acts Revision Act 1915 (6 Geo. V. No. 2763) to a reference to the Friendly Societies Act 1915 (6 Geo. V. No. 2656))
Enemy Contracts Cancellation Act 1915	6 Geo. V. No. 2603	6 September 1915
An Act to provide for the Cancellation of Contracts with the Enemy.
Williamstown Land Act 1915	6 Geo. V. No. 2604	6 September 1915
An Act to revoke the Permanent Reservation of certain Land in the Municipal District of Williamstown as a Site for Military Purposes.
Melbourne to Burwood Tramways Act 1915	6 Geo. V. No. 2605	6 September 1915
An Act to amend the Melbourne to Burwood Tramways Act 1914. (Note: Melbourne to Burwood Tramways Act 1914 (4 Geo. V. No. 2488))
Linton to Skipton Railway Land Act 1915 (repealed)	6 Geo. V. No. 2606	6 September 1915
An Act to authorize the Board of Land and Works and the Linton to Skipton Railway Construction Trust to sell or dispose of certain Lands acquired by the said Trust and for other purposes. (Repealed by Transport Act 1983 (No. 9921))
Country Roads Act 1912 Amendment Act 1915 or the Country Roads Act 1915 (No. 2) (repealed)	6 Geo. V. No. 2607	6 September 1915
An Act to further amend the Country Roads Act 1912. (Note: Country Roads Act 1912 (3 Geo. V. No. 2415); this was amended by the Sessional Acts Revision Act 1915 (6 Geo. V. No. 2763) to a reference to the Country Roads Act 1915 (6 Geo. V. No. 2635)) (Repealed by Country Roads Act 1928 (19 Geo. V. No. 3662))
Show Day Holiday (Temporary Suspension) Act 1915	6 Geo. V. No. 2608	6 September 1915
An Act to amend the Law relating to the Royal Agricultural Show Day.
Acts Interpretation Act 1915 (repealed)	6 Geo. V. No. 2609	6 September 1915
An Act for the Interpretation of Legislative Enactments and for Shortening the Language used therein. (Repealed by Acts Interpretation Act 1928 (19 Geo. V. No. 3630))
Aborigines Act 1915 (repealed)	6 Geo. V. No. 2610	6 September 1915
An Act to consolidate the Law relating to the Aboriginal Natives of Victoria. (Repealed by Aborigines Act 1928 (19 Geo. V. No. 3631))
Administration and Probate Act 1915 (repealed)	6 Geo. V. No. 2611	6 September 1915
An Act to consolidate the Law relating to the Administration of the Estates of Deceased Persons. (Repealed by Administration and Probate Act 1928 (19 Geo. V. No. 3632))
Agent-General's Act 1915 (repealed)	6 Geo. V. No. 2612	6 September 1915
An Act to consolidate the Law relating to the Agent-General for Victoria. (Repealed by Agent-General's Act 1928 (19 Geo. V. No. 3633))
Agricultural Colleges Act 1915 (repealed)	6 Geo. V. No. 2613	6 September 1915
An Act to consolidate the Law relating to Colleges of Agriculture. (Repealed by Agricultural Colleges Act 1928 (19 Geo. V. No. 3634))
Arbitration Act 1915 (repealed)	6 Geo. V. No. 2614	6 September 1915
An Act to consolidate the Law relating to Arbitration. (Repealed by Arbitration Act 1928 (19 Geo. V. No. 3637))
Auction Sales Act 1915 (repealed)	6 Geo. V. No. 2615	6 September 1915
An Act to consolidate the Law relating to Sales by Auction and Auctioneers. (Repealed by Auction Sales Act 1928 (19 Geo. V. No. 3639))
Audit Act 1915 (repealed)	6 Geo. V. No. 2516	6 September 1915
An Act to consolidate the Law for the Collection and Payment of the Public Moneys the Audit of the Public Accounts and the Protection and Recovery of the Public Property. (Repealed by Audit Act 1928 (19 Geo. V. No. 3640))
Bakers and Millers Act 1915	6 Geo. V. No. 2617	6 September 1915
An Act to consolidate the Law relating to Bakers and Millers.
Banks and Currency Act 1915	6 Geo. V. No. 2618	6 September 1915
An Act to consolidate the Law relating to Banks and the Currency.
Bees Act 1915	6 Geo. V. No. 2619	6 September 1915
An Act to consolidate the Law relating to Diseases of Bees.
Beet Sugar Works Act 1915	6 Geo. V. No. 2620	6 September 1915
An Act to consolidate the Law relating to the Sugar Beet Industry in Victoria.
Boilers Inspection Act 1915	6 Geo. V. No. 2621	6 September 1915
An Act to consolidate the Law relating to the Inspection and Regulation of Boilers.
Building Societies Act 1915	6 Geo. V. No. 2622	6 September 1915
An Act to consolidate the Law relating; to Building Societies.
Butchers and Abattoirs Act 1915	6 Geo. V. No. 2623	6 September 1915
An Act to consolidate the Law relating to Butchers and Abattoirs.
Carriages Act 1915	6 Geo. V. No. 2624	6 September 1915
An Act to consolidate the Law relating to Licensed Carriages.
Carriers and Innkeepers Act 1915	6 Geo. V. No. 2625	6 September 1915
An Act to consolidate the Law relating to Carriers Innkeepers and others.
Cemeteries Act 1915	6 Geo. V. No. 2626	6 September 1915
An Act to consolidate the Law relating to Cemeteries and Cremation.
Children's Court Act 1915	6 Geo. V. No. 2627	6 September 1915
An Act to consolidate the Law relating to Children's Courts.
Chinese Act 1915	6 Geo. V. No. 2628	6 September 1915
An Act to consolidate the Law relating to Chinese Residents.
Closer Settlement Act 1915	6 Geo. V. No. 2629	6 September 1915
An Act to consolidate the Law relating to the Acquisition and Disposal of Land for the purposes of Closer Settlement and for other purposes.
Coal Mines Regulation Act 1915	6 Geo. V. No. 2630	6 September 1915
An Act to consolidate the Law relating to the Regulation of Coal Mines
Companies Act 1915	6 Geo. V. No. 2631	6 September 1915
An Act to consolidate and amend the Law relating to Companies.
Constitution Act Amendment Act 1915	6 Geo. V. No. 2632	6 September 1915
An Act to consolidate the Law relating to the Amendment of the Constitution.
Conveyancing Act 1915	6 Geo. V. No. 2633	6 September 1915
An Act to consolidate the Law relating to Conveyancing.
Coroners Act 1915	6 Geo. V. No. 2634	6 September 1915
An Act to consolidate the Law relating to Coroners.
Country Roads Act 1915 (repealed)	6 Geo. V. No. 2635	6 September 1915
An Act to consolidate the Law relating to Country Roads. (Repealed by Country Roads Act 1928 (19 Geo. V. No. 3662))
County Court Act 1915 (repealed)	6 Geo. V. No. 2636	6 September 1915
An Act to consolidate the Law relating to County Courts. (Repealed by County Court Act 1928 (19 Geo. V. No. 3663))
Crimes Act 1915	6 Geo. V. No. 2637	6 September 1915
An Act to consolidate and amend the Law relating to Crimes and Criminal Offenders.
Crown Remedies and Liability Act 1915	6 Geo. V. No. 2638	6 September 1915
An Act to consolidate the Law relating to the Protection and Recovery of Crown Property and the enforcement of Claims against the Crown.
Dairy Supervision Act 1915	6 Geo. V. No. 2639	6 September 1915
An Act to consolidate the Law regulating the Production and Sale of Milk and Dairy Produce and for other purposes.
Developmental Railways Act 1915	6 Geo. V. No. 2640	6 September 1915
An Act to consolidate the Law relating to Developmental Railways in Country Districts.
Dog Act 1915	6 Geo. V. No. 2641	6 September 1915
An Act to consolidate the Law relating to Dogs.
Drainage Areas Act 1915	6 Geo. V. No. 2642	6 September 1915
An Act to consolidate the Law relating to the Drainage of Land in Drainage Areas.
Drainage of Land Act 1915	6 Geo. V. No. 2643	6 September 1915
An Act to consolidate the Law relating to the Drainage of Land lor Agricultural and other purposes.
Education Act 1915	6 Geo. V. No. 2644	6 September 1915
An Act to consolidate the Law relating to Education.
Electric Light and Power Act 1915	6 Geo. V. No. 2645	6 September 1915
An Act to consolidate the Law relating to the supply of Electricity for Lighting and for other purposes.
Employers and Employés Act 1915 or the Employers and Employees Act 1915 (repealed)	6 Geo. V. No. 2646	6 September 1915
An Act to consolidate the Law relating to Employers and Employés. (Repealed by Employers and Employés Act 1928 (19 Geo. V. No. 3673))
Evidence Act 1915	6 Geo. V. No. 2647	6 September 1915
An Act to consolidate and amend the Law of Evidence.
Explosives Act 1915	6 Geo. V. No. 2648	6 September 1915
An Act to consolidate the Law relating to the Importation Carriage Storage Manufacture and Sale of Explosives.
Export Products Act 1915	6 Geo. V. No. 2649	6 September 1915
An Act to consolidate the Law providing for Inspection of Live Stock, Meat, Dairy Produce, Fruit, and other products intended for Export and regulating the Exportation thereof.
Factories and Shops Act 1915	6 Geo. V. No. 2650	6 September 1915
An Act to consolidate the Law relating to the Supervision and Regulation of Factories and Shops.
Fences Act 1915	6 Geo. V. No. 2651	6 September 1915
An Act to consolidate the Law relating to Dividing and Vermin-proof Fences.
Fertilizers Act 1915	6 Geo. V. No. 2652	6 September 1915
An Act to consolidate the Law relating to the Sale of Fertilizers.
Fire Brigades Act 1915	6 Geo. V. No. 2653	6 September 1915
An Act to consolidate the Law relating to the Protection of Life and Property from Fire and for other purposes.
Fisheries Act 1915	6 Geo. V. No. 2654	6 September 1915
An Act to consolidate the Law relating to Fisheries.
Forests Act 1915	6 Geo. V. No. 2655	6 September 1915
An Act to consolidate the Law for the Management and Protection of btate forests.
Friendly Societies Act 1915	6 Geo. V. No. 2656	6 September 1915
An Act to consolidate the Law relating to Friendly Societies.
Fruit Act 1915	6 Geo. V. No. 2657	6 September 1915
An Act to consolidate the Law relating to Cool Stores for Fruit, Fruit and Vegetable Packing and Sale and Fruit Cases.
Game Act 1915	6 Geo. V. No. 2653	6 September 1915
An Act to consolidate the Law relating to the Protection of Game.
Gaols Act 1915	6 Geo. V. No. 2659	6 September 1915
An Act to consolidate and amend the Law relating to Gaols.
Geelong Harbor Trust Act 1915	6 Geo. V. No. 2660	6 September 1915
An Act to consolidate the Law relating to the Geelong Harbor Trust.
Geelong Waterworks and Sewerage Act 1915	6 Geo. V. No. 2661	6 September 1915
An Act to consolidate the Law relating to Geelong Waterworks and Sewerage.
Gold Buyers Act 1915	6 Geo. V. No. 2662	6 September 1915
An Act to consolidate the Law relating to Gold Buyers and Assayers and for other purposes.
Goods Act 1915	6 Geo. V. No. 2663	6 September 1915
An Act to consolidate the Law relating to Dealings in Goods.
Hawkers and Pedlers Act 1915	6 Geo. V. No. 2664	6 September 1915
An Act to consolidate the Law relating to Hawkers and Pedlers.
Health Act 1915	6 Geo. V. No. 2665	6 September 1915
An Act to consolidate the Law relating to Public Health.
Hospitals and Charities Act 1915	6 Geo. V. No. 2666	6 September 1915
An Act to consolidate the Law relating to Hospitals and Charities.
Imprisonment of Fraudulent Debtors Act 1915	6 Geo. V. No. 2667	6 September 1915
An Act to consolidate and amend the Law relating to the Imprisonment of Fraudulent Debtors.
Income Tax Act 1915	6 Geo. V. No. 2668	6 September 1915
An Act to consolidate the Law relating to the Imposition of Income Tax.
Inebriates Act 1915	6 Geo. V. No. 2669	6 September 1915
An Act to consolidate the Law providing for the care, control, and treatment of Inebriates.
Infant Life Protection Act 1915	6 Geo. V. No. 2670	6 September 1915
An Act to consolidate the Law relating to the Protection of Infant Life and for other purposes.
Insolvency Act 1915	6 Geo. V. No. 2671	6 September 1915
An Act to consolidate the Law relating to Insolvency.
Instruments Act 1915	6 Geo. V. No. 2672	6 September 1915
An Act to consolidate the Law relating to Instruments and Securities.
Inter-State Destitute Persons Relief Act 1915	6 Geo. V. No. 2673	6 September 1915
An Act to consolidate the Law relating to the Relief of Persons whose Relatives liable to support them reside in another State of the Commonwealth, and for other purposes.
Juries Act 1915	6 Geo. V. No. 2674	6 September 1915
An Act to consolidate and amend the Law relating to Juries.
Justices Act 1915	6 Geo. V. No. 2675	6 September 1915
An Act to consolidate and amend the Law relating to Justices of the Peace and Courts of General and Petty Sessions.
Land Act 1915	6 Geo. V. No. 2676	6 September 1915
An Act to consolidate the Law relating to the Sale and Occupation of Crown Lands.
Landlord and Tenant Act 1915	6 Geo. V. No. 2677	6 September 1915
An Act to consolidate the Law relating to Landlord and Tenant.
Lands Compensation Act 1915	6 Geo. V. No. 2678	6 September 1915
An Act to consolidate the Law relating to the mode of procedure m taking and determining the Compensation to be paid for Lands required by the State for Public Works.
Land Surveyors Act 1915	6 Geo. V. No. 2679	6 September 1915
An Act to consolidate the Law regulating the Licensing of Surveyors and for other purposes.
Land Tax Act 1915	6 Geo. V. No. 2680	6 September 1915
An Act to consolidate the Law providing for a Tax on the Unimproved Value of Land and for the Assessment of Land and other purposes.
Legal Profession Practice Act 1915	6 Geo. V. No. 2681	6 September 1915
An Act to consolidate the Law regulating the Practice of the Legal Profession.
Libraries Act 1915	6 Geo. V. No. 2682	6 September 1915
An Act to consolidate the Laws relating to Libraries.
Licensing Act 1915	6 Geo. V. No. 2683	6 September 1915
An Act to consolidate the Law relating to the Licensing of Public Houses and the Sale of Fermented and Spirituous Liquors.
Lifts Regulation Act 1915	6 Geo. V. No. 2684	6 September 1915
An Act to consolidate the Law regulating the use of Passenger and other Lifts.
Livery and Agistment Act 1915	6 Geo. V. No. 2685	6 September 1915
An Act to consolidate the Law for the better Protection of Livery-stable Keepers and Agisters of Cattle, and for other purposes.
Local Government Act 1915	6 Geo. V. No. 2686	6 September 1915
An Act to consolidate the Law relating to Local Government.
Lunacy Act 1915	6 Geo. V. No. 2687	6 September 1915
An Act to consolidate the Law relating to the Insane.
Marine Act 1915	6 Geo. V. No. 2688	6 September 1915
An Act to consolidate the Law relating to Passengers Harbors and Navigation.
Marine Stores and Old Metals Act 1915	6 Geo. V. No. 2689	6 September 1915
An Act to consolidate the Law relating to Collectors of and Dealers in Special Wares Marine Stores and Old Metals.
Markets Act 1915	6 Geo. V. No. 2690	6 September 1915
An Act to consolidate the Law relating to Markets.
Marriage Act 1915	6 Geo. V. No. 2691	6 September 1915
An Act to consolidate the Law relating to Marriage and to Guardianship and Custody of Infants and to Deserted Wives and Children and to Divorce and Matrimonial Causes.
Married Women's Property Act 1915	6 Geo. V. No. 2692	6 September 1915
An Act to consolidate the Law relating to the Property of Married Women.
Master and Apprentice Act 1915	6 Geo. V. No. 2693	6 September 1915
An Act to consolidate the Law relating to Masters and Apprentices.
Meat Supervision Act 1915	6 Geo. V. No. 2694	6 September 1915
An Act to consolidate the Law relating to the proper supervision of the Slaughtering of Animals and the Sale of Meat and for other purposes.
Medical Act 1915	6 Geo. V. No. 2695	6 September 1915
An Act to consolidate and amend the Law relating to Medical Practitioners Dentists and Chemists and to adopt and continue the British Pharmacopœia.
Melbourne and Metropolitan Board of Works Act 1915 (repealed)	6 Geo. V. No. 2696	6 September 1915
An Act to consolidate the Law relating to the Melbourne and Metropolitan Board of Works. (Repealed by Melbourne and Metropolitan Board of Works Act 1928 (19 Geo. V. No. 3731))
Melbourne Harbor Trust Act 1915 (repealed)	6 Geo. V. No. 2697	6 September 1915
An Act to consolidate the Law providing for the Regulation Management and Improvement of the Port of Melbourne and certain portions of the River Yarra Yarra and certain portions of the Maribyrnong River and for other purposes connected therewith. (Repealed by Melbourne Harbor Trust Act 1928 (19 Geo. V. No. 3733))
Mines Act 1915	6 Geo. V. No. 2698	6 September 1915
An Act to consolidate the Law relating to Mines.
Mining Development Act 1915	6 Geo. V. No. 2699	6 September 1915
An Act to consolidate the Law relating to Advances to Companies and Persons to further develop Mining and for other purposes.
Mint Act 1915 (repealed)	6 Geo. V. No. 2700	6 September 1915
An Act to consolidate the Law relating to the Maintenance in Victoria of a Branch of the Royal Mint. (Repealed by Mint Act 1928 (19 Geo. V. No. 3739))
Money Lenders Act 1915	6 Geo. V. No. 2701	6 September 1915
An Act to consolidate the Law with respect to persons carrying on Business as Money Lenders.
Motor Car Act 1915 (repealed)	6 Geo. V. No. 2702	6 September 1915
An Act to consolidate the Law regulating the use of Motor Cars. (Repealed by Motor Car Act 1928 (19 Geo. V. No. 3741))
Neglected Children's Act 1915	6 Geo. V. No. 2703	6 September 1915
An Act to consolidate the Law relating to Neglected Children.
Partnership Act 1915	6 Geo. V. No. 2704	6 September 1915
An Act to consolidate the Law relating to Partnership and the Registration of Firms.
Pawnbrokers Act 1915	6 Geo. V. No. 2705	6 September 1915
An Act to consolidate the Law relating to Pawnbrokers.
Penalties Act 1915	6 Geo. V. No. 2706	6 September 1915
An Act to consolidate the Law relating to Penalties.
Poisons Act 1915	6 Geo. V. No. 2707	6 September 1915
An Act to consolidate the Law relating to the Sale and Use of Poisons and Poisonous Substances and Preparations.
Police Offences Act 1915	6 Geo. V. No. 2708	6 September 1915
An Act to consolidate the Law relating to Police Offences.
Police Regulation Act 1915	6 Geo. V. No. 2709	6 September 1915
An Act to consolidate the Law relating to the Police Force in Victoria.
Pounds Act 1915	6 Geo. V. No. 2710	6 September 1915
An Act to consolidate the Law relating to the Impounding of Cattle.
Printers and Newspapers Act 1915	6 Geo. V. No. 2711	6 September 1915
An Act to consolidate the Law relating to the preventing the Printing and Publishing of Books and Papers by Persons not known and to the Printing and Publishing of Newspapers.
Provident Societies Act 1915	6 Geo. V. No. 2712	6 September 1915
An Act to consolidate the Law relating to Provident Societies.
Public Service Act 1915	6 Geo. V. No. 2713	6 September 1915
An Act to consolidate the Law relating to the Public Service of Victoria.
Public Works Act 1915	6 Geo. V. No. 2714	6 September 1915
An Act to consolidate the Law relating; to Public Works.
Railway Lands Acquisition Act 1915	6 Geo. V. No. 2715	6 September 1915
An Act to consolidate the Law relating to the acquisition of Lands required for the construction of Lines of Railway.
Railways Act 1915	6 Geo. V. No. 2716	6 September 1915
An Act to consolidate the Law relating to Railways.
Railways Standing Committee Act 1915	6 Geo. V. No. 2717	6 September 1915
An Act to consolidate the Law relating to the Railways Standing Committee.
Rating on Unimproved Values Act 1915	6 Geo. V. No. 2817	6 September 1915
An Act to consolidate the Law relating to the Optional Rating by Municipalities on the basis of the Unimproved Values of Rateable Property.
Real Property Act 1915	6 Geo. V. No. 2719	6 September 1915
An Act to consolidate the Law relating to Real Property.
Registration of Births Deaths and Marriages Act 1915 (repealed)	6 Geo. V. No. 2720	6 September 1915
An Act to consolidate the Law relating to the Registration of Births Deaths and Marriages. (Repealed by Registration of Births Deaths and Marriages Act 1928 (19 Geo. V. No. 3764)
Seamen's Act 1915	6 Geo. V. No. 2721	6 September 1915
An Act to consolidate the Law relating to Seamen.
Seeds Act 1915	6 Geo. V. No. 2722	6 September 1915
An Act to consolidate the Law relating to Seeds.
Senate Elections (Times and Places) Act 1915	6 Geo. V. No. 2723	6 September 1915
An Act to consolidate the Law relating to the Election of Senators for Victoria to the Senate of the Commonwealth.
Servants' Registry Offices Act 1915	6 Geo. V. No. 2724	6 September 1915
An Act to consolidate the Law relating to the regulation of Servants' Registry Offices.
Settled Estates and Settled Lands Act 1915	6 Geo. V. No. 2725	6 September 1915
An Act to consolidate the Law relating to Settled Estates and Settled Lands.
Shearers' Hut Accommodation Act 1915	6 Geo. V. No. 2726	6 September 1915
An Act to consolidate the Law relating to Hut Accommodation for Shearers.
Sheep Dipping Act 1915	6 Geo. V. No. 2727	6 September 1915
An Act to consolidate the Law relating to the Compulsory Dipping of Sheep.
Stamps Act 1915	6 Geo. V. No. 2728	6 September 1915
An Act to consolidate the Law relating to Stamps.
State Savings Bank Act 1915 (repealed)	6 Geo. V. No. 2729	6 September 1915
An Act to consolidate and amend the Law relating to the State Savings Bank of Victoria. (Repealed by State Savings Bank Act 1928 (19 Geo. V. No. 3777))
Statistics Act 1915	6 Geo. V. No. 2730	6 September 1915
An Act to consolidate the Law relating to the Government Statist and to Statistics.
Stock Diseases Act 1915	6 Geo. V. No. 2731	6 September 1915
An Act to consolidate the Law relating to Diseases in Stock.
Stock Foods Act 1915	6 Geo. V. No. 2732	6 September 1915
An Act to consolidate the Law regulating the Sale of Chaff and other Foods for Stock.
Supreme Court Act 1915 (repealed)	6 Geo. V. No. 2733	6 September 1915
An Act to consolidate and amend the Law relating to the Supreme Court. (Repealed by Supreme Court Act 1928 (19 Geo. V. No. 3783))
Temperance Halls Act 1915	6 Geo. V. No. 2734	6 September 1915
An Act to consolidate the Law enabling Trustees of Temperance Halls to demise certain lands for terms of years and to raise Loans on the Rents of such lands and buildings and for other purposes.
Theatres Act 1915	6 Geo. V. No. 2735	6 September 1915
An Act to consolidate the Law relating to Licensed Theatres.
Thistle Act 1915	6 Geo. V. No. 2736	6 September 1915
An Act to consolidate the Law relating to the Eradication of Thistles.
Trade Unions Act 1915	6 Geo. V. No. 2737	6 September 1915
An Act to consolidate the Law relating to Trade Unions.
Training Ships Act 1915	6 Geo. V. No. 2738	6 September 1915
An Act to consolidate the Law relating to Training Ships.
Tramways Act 1915	6 Geo. V. No. 2739	6 September 1915
An Act to consolidate the Law relating to Tramways.
Transfer of Land Act 1915	6 Geo. V. No. 2740	6 September 1915
An Act to consolidate the Law relating to the Simplification of the Title to and the Dealing with Estates in Land.
Trusts Act 1915	6 Geo. V. No. 2741	6 September 1915
An Act to consolidate and amend the Law relating to Trusts and Trustees.
University Act 1915 (repealed)	6 Geo. V. No. 2742	6 September 1915
An Act to consolidate the Law relating to the University of Melbourne. (Repealed by University Act 1928 (19 Geo. V. No. 3795))
Unlawful Assemblies and Processions Act 1915	6 Geo. V. No. 2743	6 September 1915
An Act to consolidate the Law relating to Unlawful Assemblies and Processions Special Constables and Riotously Disturbed Districts.
Vegetation and Vine Diseases Act 1915	6 Geo. V. No. 2744	6 September 1915
An Act to consolidate the Law relating to Diseases of Vegetation and Vines.
Vermin Destruction Act 1915	6 Geo. V. No. 2745	6 September 1915
An Act to consolidate the Law relating to the Destruction and Suppression of Rabbits and other Vermin.
Veterinary Surgeons Act 1915	6 Geo. V. No. 2746	6 September 1915
An Act to consolidate the Law relating to Veterinary Surgeons.
Water Act 1915	6 Geo. V. No. 2747	6 September 1915
An Act to consolidate the Law relating to the Conservation and Supply of Water to declare the Law relating to certain Rights in Natural Waters the property in the beds and banks containing the same and for other purposes.
Weights and Measures Act 1915	6 Geo. V. No. 2748	6 September 1915
An Act to consolidate the Law relating to Weights and Measures.
Wills Act 1915	6 Geo. V. No. 2749	6 September 1915
An Act to consolidate the Laws relating to Wills.
Workers' Compensation Act 1915	6 Geo. V. No. 2750	6 September 1915
An Act to consolidate the Law relating to Compensation to Workers tor Injuries occurring in the course of their Employment.
Wrongs Act 1915 (repealed)	6 Geo. V. No. 2751	6 September 1915
An Act to consolidate the Law relating to Wrongs. (Repealed by Wrongs Act 1928 (19 Geo. V. No. 3807))
Mining Development Acts Amendment Act 1915 or the Mining Development Act 1915 (No. 2)	6 Geo. V. No. 2752	6 September 1915
An Act to amend the Mining Development Acts (Note: This was amended by the Sessional Acts Revision Act 1915 (6 Geo. V. No. 2763) to a reference to the Mining Development Act 1915 (6 Geo. V. No. 2699)) and for other purposes.
Medical Act 1890 Further Amendment Act 1915 or the Medical Act 1915 (No. 2)	6 Geo. V. No. 2753	6 September 1915
An Act to amend the Law relating to Medical Practitioners.
Rushworth to Stanhope North Railway Construction Act 1915 (repealed)	6 Geo. V. No. 2754	6 September 1915
An Act to authorize the Construction by the State of a Line of Railway from Rushworth to Stanhope North. (Repealed by Transport Act 1983 (No. 9921))
Registration of Births Deaths and Marriages Act 1915 (No. 2) (repealed)	6 Geo. V. No. 2755	14 September 1915
An Act to amend the Law relating to the Registration of Births Deaths and Marriages. (Repealed by Registration of Births Deaths and Marriages Act 1928 (19 Geo. V. No. 3764)
Government Securities (Redemption) Act 1915 (repealed)	6 Geo. V. No. 2756	14 September 1915
An Act to make Provision for Extending the Date of Redemption of Government Securities. (Repealed by Treasury Legislation (Repeal) Act 2005 (No. 73 of 2005))
Execution of Instruments Act 1915	6 Geo. V. No. 2757	14 September 1915
An Act to facilitate the Execution of Instruments and Powers of Attorney during the Present War.
Indeterminate Sentences Act 1915	6 Geo. V. No. 2758	22 September 1915
An Act to amend the Indeterminate Sentences Act 1907. (Note: Indeterminate Sentences Act 1907 (7 Edw. VII. No. 2106); this was amended by the Sessional Acts Revision Act 1915 (6 Geo. V. No. 2763) to a reference to the Crimes Act 1915 (6 Geo. V. No. 2637))
Boilers Inspection Act 1906 Amendment Act 1915 or the Boilers Inspection Act 1915 (No. 2)	6 Geo. V. No. 2759	22 September 1915
An Act to further amend the Boilers Inspection Act 1906. (Note: Boilers Inspection Act 1906 (6 Edw. VII. No. 2071); this was amended by the Sessional Acts Revision Act 1915 (6 Geo. V. No. 2763) to a reference to the Boilers Inspection Act 1915 (6 Geo. V. No. 2621))
Royal Society Land Act 1915	6 Geo. V. No. 2760	22 September 1915
An Act to authorize the Trustees of certain Land permanently reserved from Sale as a Site for the use of the Royal Society of Victoria to borrow upon the Security of the said Land and to demise part of the said Land and to permit the temporary use of certain Buildings on the said Land and for other purposes.
Sewerage Districts Act 1915	6 Geo. V. No. 2761	24 September 1915
An Act to make provision for Sewerage Districts and the Sewering thereof and for other purposes.
Victorian Loans (Rates of Interest) Act 1915	6 Geo. V. No. 2762	1 October 1915
An Act to amend the Victorian Loans (Rates of Interest) Act 1913. (Note: Victorian Loans (Rates of Interest) Act 1913 (4 Geo. V. No. 2474))
Sessional Acts Revision Act 1915	6 Geo. V. No. 2763	1 October 1915
An Act to adapt certain References in Acts passed during the present Session of Parliament to the Provisions of the Consolidating Acts passed during the said Session and to revise the Language of certain of the first-mentioned Acts and for other purposes.
	6 Geo. V. No. 2764	12 October 1915
An act to apply out of the Consolidated Revenue the sum of Six hundred and sixty-seven thousand three hundred and twenty pounds to the service of the year One thousand nine hundred and fifteen and One thousand nine hundred and sixteen.
Nandaly To Kulwin Railway Construction Act 1915	6 Geo. V. No. 2765	19 October 1915
An Act to authorize the Construction by the State of a Line of Railway from Nandaly to Kulwin.
Geelong Waterworks and Sewerage (Borrowing Powers) Act 1915	6 Geo. V. No. 2766	26 October 1915
An Act to amend the Geelong Waterworks and Sewerage Act 1915. (Note: Geelong Waterworks and Sewerage Act 1915 (6 Geo. V. No. 2661))
Developmental Railways Act 1915 (No. 2)	6 Geo. V. No. 2767	26 October 1915
An Act to amend the Developmental Railways Act 1915. (Note: Developmental Railways Act 1915 (6 Geo. V. No. 2640))
	6 Geo. V. No. 2768	10 November 1915
An Act to apply out of the Consolidated Revenue the sum of Six hundred and thirty-nine thousand two hundred and thirteen pounds to the service of the year One thousand nine hundred and fifteen and One thousand nine hundred and sixteen.
Bittern to Red Hill Railway Construction Act 1915	6 Geo. V. No. 2769	23 November 1915
An Act to authorize the Construction by the State of a Line of Railway from Bittern to Red Hill.
Land Act 1915 (No. 2)	6 Geo. V. No. 2770	23 November 1915
An Act to amend the Land Act 1915. (Note: Land Act 1915 (6 Geo. V. No. 2676))
Default Summonses Act 1915	6 Geo. V. No. 2771	30 November 1915
An Act to amend the Law relating to Default Summonses.
Dairy Cattle Advances Act 1915	6 Geo. V. No. 2772	30 November 1915
An Act to provide for Advances on certain Terms to Farmers to enable them to procure Dairy Cattle and for other purposes.
Midwives Act 1915	6 Geo. V. No. 2773	30 November 1915
An Act to provide for the Registration and Better Training of Midwives and to regulate their Practice.
Enemy Property Act 1915	6 Geo. V. No. 2774	30 November 1915
An Act to make provision in regard to the Custody of Property of Alien Enemies during the Present War and for other purposes.
Marriage (Facilities) Act 1915	6 Geo. V. No. 2775	1 December 1915
An Act to facilitate Marriages between British Subjects resident in Victoria and British Subjects resident in the United Kingdom.
Licensing (Rents and Fees Adjustment) Act 1915	6 Geo. V. No. 2776	1 December 1915
An Act relating to the Adjustment of Rents in respect of certain Licensed Victuallers' Premises affected by the Operation of the Intoxicating Liquor (Temporary Restriction) Act 1915 (Note: Intoxicating Liquor (Temporary Restriction) Act 1915 (6 Geo. V. No. 2584)) and to the Rebate of certain Fees under the Licensing Acts and for other purposes.
Juries Act 1915 (No. 2)	6 Geo. V. No. 2777	7 December 1915
An Act to amend the Juries Act 1915 (Note: Juries Act 1915 (6 Geo. V. No. 2674)) and for other purposes.
Supreme Court Act 1915 (No. 3) (repealed)	6 Geo. V. No. 2778	14 December 1915
An Act to amend Section Forty-seven of the Supreme Court Act 1915 (Note: Supreme Court Act 1915 (6 Geo. V. No. 2733)) and for other purposes. (Repealed by Supreme Court Act 1928 (19 Geo. V. No. 3783))
Education (No. 2) Act 1915	6 Geo. V. No. 2779	14 December 1915
An Act to amend the Education Act 1915. (Note: Education Act 1915 (6 Geo. V. No. 2644))
Prahran and Malvern Tramways Trust Act 1915	6 Geo. V. No. 2780	14 December 1915
An Act relating to the Borrowing Powers of the Prahran and Malvern Tramways Trust.
Kew (Burke-road) Tramway Act 1915	6 Geo. V. No. 2781	14 December 1915
An Act to provide for the Construction Operation and Management by the Prahran and Malvern Tramways Trust of a certain Tramway in the Municipal District of Kew.
Clifton Springs Hotel Act 1915	6 Geo. V. No. 2782	14 December 1915
An Act to make provision in regard to the Victualler's Licence issued in respect of the Clifton Springs Hotel agreed to be leased to The Commonwealth of Australia as an Establishment for Convalescent Members of The Australian Imperial Forces.
	6 Geo. V. No. 2783	14 December 1915
An Act to apply out of the Consolidated Revenue the sum of Six hundred and forty thousand two hundred and thirty-seven pounds to the service of the year One thousand nine hundred and fifteen and One thousand nine hundred and sixteen.
Treasury Bonds Act 1915	6 Geo. V. No. 2784	14 December 1915
An Act to amend the Treasury Bonds Act 1914. (Note: Treasury Bonds Act 1914 (5 Geo. V. No. 2563))
Treasury Bonds Act 1915 (No. 2)	6 Geo. V. No. 2785	14 December 1915
An Act to authorize the Issue of Treasury Bonds.
Saint Kilda Tramway Act 1915	6 Geo. V. No. 2786	14 December 1915
An Act to extend the Provisions of the Tramways Act 1915 (Note: Tramways Act 1915 (6 Geo. V. No. 2739)) to the Municipality of Saint Kilda within certain Limits and for other purposes.
Land Tax Act 1915 (No. 2)	6 Geo. V. No. 2787	14 December 1915
An Act to declare the Rate of Land Tax for the Year ending the thirty-first day of December One thousand nine hundred and sixteen.
Justices Act 1915 (No. 2)	6 Geo. V. No. 2788	14 December 1915
An Act to amend Section One hundred and eighty-four of the Justices Act 1915 (Note: Justices Act 1915 (6 Geo. V. No. 2675)) and for other purposes.
Crimes Act 1915 (No. 2)	6 Geo. V. No. 2789	14 December 1915
An Act to amend the Crimes Act 1915. (Note: Crimes Act 1915 (6 Geo. V. No. 2637))
Melbourne and Metropolitan Board of Works Act 1915 (No. 2)	6 Geo. V. No. 2790	14 December 1915
An Act to amend the Melbourne and Metropolitan Board of Works Act 1915. (Note: Melbourne and Metropolitan Board of Works Act 1915 (6 Geo. V. No. 2696))
Sessional Acts Revision Act 1915 (No. 2)	6 Geo. V. No. 2791	23 December 1915
An Act to amend the Sessional Acts Revision Act 1915 (Note: Sessional Acts Revision Act 1915 (6 Geo. V. No. 2763)) and to correct certain Errors in the Consolidating Acts passed during the present Session and for other purposes.
State Savings Bank Act 1915 (No. 3) (repealed)	6 Geo. V. No. 2792	23 December 1915
An Act to further amend the State Savings Bank Act 1915. (Note: State Savings Bank Act 1915 (6 Geo. V. No. 2729)) (Repealed by State Savings Bank Act 1928 (19 Geo. V. No. 3777))
Mandurang Lands Act 1915	6 Geo. V. No. 2793	23 December 1915
An Act to revoke as to Part the Permanent Reservation and Crown Grant of certain Land in the Parishes of Lockwood and Mandurang permanently reserved from Sale for Victorian Water Supply purposes.
Victorian Loan Act 1915	6 Geo. V. No. 2794	23 December 1915
An Act to authorize the raising of Money for Railways Public Works and other purposes.
Willaura Land Act 1915	6 Geo. V. No. 2795	23 December 1915
An Act to provide for the Exchange of certain Lands in the Parish of Willaura County of Ripon and for other purposes.
Railway Loan Application Act 1915	6 Geo. V. No. 2796	23 December 1915
An Act to sanction the issue and application of certain Sums of Money available under Loan Acts for Railways and for other purposes.
Tobacco Sellers Act 1915	6 Geo. V. No. 2797	23 December 1915
An Act relating to Sellers of Tobacco Cigars Cigarettes and Snuff.
Public Service Act 1915 (No. 2)	6 Geo. V. No. 2798	23 December 1915
An Act to amend the Public Service Act 1915. (Note: Public Service Act 1915 (6 Geo. V. No. 2713))
Income Tax Act 1915 (No. 2)	6 Geo. V. No. 2799	23 December 1915
An Act to amend the Law relating to the Imposition of Income Tax and for other purposes.
Special Funds Act 1915 (repealed)	6 Geo. V. No. 2800	23 December 1915
An Act to provide for the Transfer out of the Assurance Fund under the Transfer of Land Act 1915 (Note: Transfer of Land Act 1915 (6 Geo. V. No. 2740)) of certain Sums and to establish in the Treasury certain Trust Funds and for other purposes. (Repealed by Public Account (Trust Funds) Act 1982 (No. 9861))
Public Works Loan Application Act 1915	6 Geo. V. No. 2801	23 December 1915
An Act to sanction the issue and application of certain Sums of Money available under Loan Acts for Public Works and other purposes.
Surplus Revenue Act 1905 Amendment Act 1915	6 Geo. V. No. 2802	23 December 1915
An Act relating to a certain Unexpended Balance under the Surplus Revenue Act 1905. (Note: Surplus Revenue Act 1905 (5 Edw. VII. No. 1969))
River Murray Waters Act 1915 (No. 2)	6 Geo. V. No. 2803	23 December 1915
An Act to amend the River Murray Waters Act 1915. (Note: River Murray Waters Act 1915 (6 Geo. V. No. 2596))
Water Supply Loans Application Act 1915	6 Geo. V. No. 2804	23 December 1915
An Act to sanction the issue and application of certain Sums of Money available under Loan Acts for Irrigation Works Water Supply Works Drainage and Flood Protection Works in Country Districts and for other purposes.
Municipal Endowment Act 1915	6 Geo. V. No. 2805	23 December 1915
An Act relating to Municipal Endowment.
Brunswick Mechanics' Institute Act 1915	6 Geo. V. No. 2806	23 December 1915
An Act to provide for the Incorporation and Government of the Brunswick Mechanics' Institute and Free Library.
Border Railways Commission Act 1915	6 Geo. V. No. 2807	23 December 1915
An Act relating to the Payment of Fees and Travelling Expenses to the Victorian Members of the Royal Commission on Border Railways.
Trusts (War Loan) Act 1915	6 Geo. V. No. 2808	23 December 1915
An Act to amend the Trusts Acts and for other purposes.
State Salaries (Commonwealth Taxation) Act 1915	6 Geo. V. No. 2809	23 December 1915
An Act relating to the Taxation by the Parliament of the Commonwealth of Australia of Salaries Reimbursements and other Moneys paid by the State of Victoria.
Health Act 1915 (No. 2)	6 Geo. V. No. 2810	30 December 1915
An Act to amend the Health Act 1915 (Note: Health Act 1915 (6 Geo. V. No. 2665)) and for other purposes.
Local Government Act 1915 (No. 2)	6 Geo. V. No. 2811	30 December 1915
An Act to further amend the Local Government Act 1915 (Note: Local Government Act 1915 (6 Geo. V. No. 2686)) and for other purposes.
Wheat Marketing Act 1915	6 Geo. V. No. 2812	30 December 1915
An Act to confer certain Powers on the Government of Victoria in regard to the Marketing of the Wheat Harvest of the Season 1915-1916 and for other purposes.
	6 Geo. V. No. 2813	30 December 1915
An Act to apply a sum out of the Consolidated Revenue to the service of the year ending on the thirtieth day of June One thousand nine hundred and sixteen and to appropriate the Supplies granted in this Session of Parliament.
Railways Act 1915 (No. 2)	6 Geo. V. No. 2814	30 December 1915
An Act to amend the Railways Act 1915. (Note: Railways Act 1915 (6 Geo. V. No. 2716))
Melbourne To Burwood Tramways Act 1915 (No. 2)	6 Geo. V. No. 2815	30 December 1915
An Act to authorize the Hawthorn Tramways Trust to acquire certain Lands to be used as a Park and for other purposes.
Footscray Tramways Act 1915	6 Geo. V. No. 2816	30 December 1915
An Act to provide for the Construction and Management of certain Tramways in the Municipal District of Footscray.
Public Account Advances Act 1915	6 Geo. V. No. 2817	30 December 1915
An Act to further amend the Public Account Advances Act 1910. (Note: Public Account Advances Act 1910 (1 Geo. V. No. 2277))
Tramway Board Act 1915	6 Geo. V. No. 2818	30 December 1915
An Act to make temporary Provision with respect to Tramways and Tramway Undertakings the Subject of Leases granted by the Melbourne Tramways Trust to the Melbourne Tramway and Omnibus Company Limited and to dissolve the said Trust and for other purposes.
Geelong Harbor Trust Act 1915 (No. 2)	6 Geo. V. No. 2819	30 December 1915
An Act to amend the Geelong Harbor Trust Act 1915 (Note: Geelong Harbor Trust Act 1915 (6 Geo. V. No. 2660)) and for other purposes.

== Sources ==
- "1915 Victorian Historical Acts". AustLII.
