= List of acts of the Parliament of Victoria from 1864 =

This is a list of acts of the Parliament of Victoria, Australia for the year 1864.

== 1864 ==
The third session of the third parliament of Victoria.

Short title, or popular name	Citation	Royal assent
Long title
	27 Vict. No. 188	5 February 1864
An Act to apply out of the Consolidated Revenue the sum of One hundred and twenty thousand seven hundred and eighty-two pounds twelve shillings and nine pence (Note: £120,728 9s 9d in 1864 is equivalent to A$18,400,000 in 2022.) to the service of the year One thousand eight hundred and sixty-three and the sum of Five hundred thousand pounds (Note: £500,000 in 1864 is equivalent to A$76,100,000 in 2022.) to the service of the year One thousand eight hundred and sixty-four.
	27 Vict. No. 189	22 March 1864 (Note: This act was reserved for approval by Her Majesty.)
An Act to repeal the appropriation of the Sum provided for the payment of the Salaries of the Governor's Staff and of the Governor's Travelling and other Expenses. (Repealed by Constitution Act Amendment Act 1890 (54 Vict. No. 1075))
Companies Statute 1864 (repealed)	27 Vict. No. 190	20 April 1864
An Act for the Incorporation Regulation and Winding-up of Trading Companies and other Associations. (Repealed by Companies Act 1890 (54 Vict. No. 1074))
	27 Vict. No. 191	20 April 1864
An Act to apply out of the Consolidated Revenue the sum of One million three hundred and thirteen thousand four hundred and nine pounds nine shillings and one penny (Note: £1,313,409 9s 1d in 1864 is equivalent to A$200,000,000 in 2022.) to the service of the year One thousand eight hundred and sixty-four.
Landlord and Tenant Statute 1864 (repealed)	27 Vict. No. 192	20 April 1864
An Act to Consolidate the Laws relating to Landlord and Tenant. (Repealed by Landlord and Tenant Act 1890 (54 Vict. No. 1108))
Master and Apprentice Statute 1864 (repealed)	27 Vict. No. 193	20 April 1864
An Act to Consolidate the Law relating to Masters and Apprentices. (Repealed by Master and Apprentice Act 1890 (54 Vict. No. 1117))
Banks and Currency Statute 1864 (repealed)	27 Vict. No. 194	20 April 1864
An Act to Consolidate the Laws relating to Banks and the Currency. (Repealed by Banks and Currency Act 1890 (54 Vict. No. 1164))
Immigration Statute 1864 (repealed)	27 Vict. No. 195	20 April 1864
An Act to Consolidate the Laws relating to Immigration into Victoria. (Repealed by Agent-General's Act 1890 (54 Vict. No. 1061))
Importation and Custody of Gunpowder Statute 1864 or the Gunpowder Statute 1864 (repealed)	27 Vict. No. 196	20 April 1864
An Act to Regulate the Importation Carriage and Custody of Gunpowder. (Repealed by Explosives Act 1890 (54 Vict. No. 1090))
Statute of Evidence 1864	27 Vict. No. 197	20 April 1864
An Act to Consolidate the Law of Evidence.
Masters and Servants Statute 1864 (repealed)	27 Vict. No. 198	20 April 1864
An Act to Consolidate the Laws relating to Masters and Servants. (Repealed by Employers and Employés Act 1890 (54 Vict. No. 1087))
Licensed Butchers and Abattoirs Statute 1864 (repealed)	27 Vict. No. 199	20 April 1864
An Act to Consolidate the Laws relating to the Abattoirs and the Slaughtering of Cattle. (Repealed by Abattoirs Statute 1869 (33 Vict. No. 356)
Chinese Immigration Statute 1864 (repealed)	27 Vict. No. 200	20 April 1864
An Act to consolidate the Laws affecting the Chinese emigrating to or resident in Victoria. (Repealed by Chinese Immigrants Statute 1865 (28 Vict. No. 259))
Cemeteries Statute 1864 (repealed)	27 Vict. No. 201	20 April 1864
An Act to Consolidate and Amend the Laws relating to Cemeteries. (Repealed by Cemeteries Act 1890 (54 Vict. No. 1072))
Markets Statute 1864 (repealed)	27 Vict. No. 202	20 April 1864
An Act to Consolidate the Laws relating to Markets. (Repealed by Markets Act 1890 (54 Vict. No. 1115))
Sales by Auction Statute 1864 (repealed)	27 Vict. No. 203	20 April 1864
An Act to Consolidate the Law relating to Sales by Auction and Auctioneers. (Repealed by Auction Sales Act 1890 (54 Vict. No. 1065))
Instruments and Securities Statute 1864	27 Vict. No. 204	20 April 1864
An Act to Consolidate the Law relating to Instruments and Securities.
Volunteer Statute 1864 (repealed)	27 Vict. No. 205	20 April 1864
An Act to Consolidate the Laws relating to the Volunteer Force. (Repealed by Volunteer Statute 1865 (28 Vict. No. 266))
Fisheries and Game Statute 1864 (repealed)	27 Vict. No. 206	20 April 1864
An Act to consolidate the Laws for the Protection of Fisheries and Game. (Repealed by Fisheries Act 1873 (37 Vict. No. 473))
	27 Vict. No. 207	20 April 1864
An Act to stay and to prevent Proceedings against persons concerned in levying certain Duties of Customs.
	27 Vict. No. 208	11 May 1864
An Act to apply out of the Consolidated Revenue the sum of Ten thousand pounds (Note: £10,000 in 1864 is equivalent to A$15,200,000 in 2022.) to the service of the year One thousand eight hundred and sixty-three and the further sum of Three hundred thousand pounds (Note: £300,000 in 1864 is equivalent to A$45,700,000 in 2022.) to the service of the year One thousand eight hundred and sixty-four.
Wharfage and Harbors Rate Act 1864 (repealed)	27 Vict. No. 209	11 May 1864
An Act to establish a Wharfage and Harbors Rate. (Repealed by Passengers Harbors and Navigation Statute 1865 (28 Vict. No. 255))
	27 Vict. No. 210	2 June 1864
An Act to allay doubts as to the validity of "The Real Property Act." (Note: Real Property Act 1862 (25 Vict. No. 140)) (Repealed by Transfer of Land Statute 1866 (29 Vict. No. 301))
	27 Vict. No. 211	2 June 1864
An Act to apply a sum out of the Consolidated Revenue to the Service of the Year One Thousand eight hundred and sixty-four and to appropriate the Supplies granted in this Session of Parliament and for other purposes.
Printers and Newspapers Registration Statute 1864 (repealed)	27 Vict. No. 212	2 June 1864
An Act to Consolidate the Laws relating to the preventing the Printing and Publishing of Books and Papers by Persons not known and to the Printing and Publishing of Newspapers. (Repealed by Printers and Newspapers Act 1890 (54 Vict. No. 1130))
Real Property Statute 1864 (repealed)	27 Vict. No. 213	2 June 1864
An Act to consolidate Acts now in force in Victoria relating to Real Property. (Repealed by Real Property Act 1890 (54 Vict. No. 1136))
Australian Mutual Provident Society's Act 1864 (repealed)	27 Vict. No. 214	2 June 1864
An Act for conferring certain powers on the Australian Mutual Provident Society. (Repealed by Legislation Reform (Repeals No. 6) Act 2010 (No. 22 of 2010)
Weights and Measures Statute 1864 (repealed)	27 Vict. No. 215	2 June 1864
An Act to amend the Law relating to Weights and Measures. (Repealed by Weights and Measures Act 1890 (54 Vict. No. 1158))
Neglected and Criminal Children's Act 1864 (repealed)	27 Vict. No. 216	2 June 1864
An Act for the amendment of the Law relating to Neglected and Criminal Children. (Repealed by Juvenile Offenders Act 1887 (51 Vict. No. 951))
Licensed Carriages Statute 1864 (repealed)	27 Vict. No. 217	2 June 1864
An Act to consolidate the Law relating to Licensed Carriages. (Repealed by Carriages Act 1890 (54 Vict. No. 1070))
Registration of Births Deaths and Marriages Statute 1864 (repealed)	27 Vict. No. 218	2 June 1864
An Act to consolidate the Law relating to the Registration of Births Deaths and Marriages. (Repealed by Registration of Births Deaths and Marriages Statute 1865 (28 Vict. No. 246))
Statute of Gaols 1864 (repealed)	27 Vict. No. 219	2 June 1864
An Act to consolidate the Law relating to Gaols. (Repealed by Gaols Act 1890 (54 Vict. No. 1096))
Hospitals and Charitable Institutions Act 1864 (repealed)	27 Vict. No. 220	2 June 1864
An Act for Hospitals and Charitable Institutions. (Repealed by Hospitals and Charities Act 1890 (54 Vict. No. 1099))
Trade Marks Statute 1864	27 Vict. No. 221	2 June 1864
An Act to amend the Law relating to the Fraudulent Marking of Merchandise.
Wills Statute 1864 (repealed)	27 Vict. No. 222	2 June 1864
An Act to consolidate the Laws relating to Wills. (Repealed by Wills Act 1890 (54 Vict. No. 1159))
	27 Vict. No. 223	2 June 1864
An Act to further amend the Real Property Act and for other purposes. (Repealed by Supreme Court Act 1890 (54 Vict. No. 1142))
Land Drainage Act 1864 (repealed)	27 Vict. No. 224	2 June 1864
An Act to facilitate the Drainage of Land for Agricultural and other Purposes. (Repealed by Drainage of Land Act 1890 (54 Vict. No. 1085))
Police Offences Statute 1864 (repealed)	27 Vict. No. 225	2 June 1864
An Act to consolidate the Law relating to the Management of Towns and other Populous Places and for the suppression of various Offences. (Repealed by Police Offences Statute 1865 (Police Offences Statute 1865))
Post Office Statute 1864 (repealed)	27 Vict. No. 226	2 June 1864
An Act to consolidate and amend the Law relating to the Post Office. (Repealed by Post Office Statute 1865 (29 Vict. No. 277))
Wines Beer and Spirit Sale Statute 1864 (repealed)	27 Vict. No. 227	2 June 1864
An Act to consolidate and amend the Laws relating to the Licensing of Public Houses and the Sale of Fermented and Spirituous Liquors. (Repealed by Licensing Act 1876 (40 Vict. No. 566))
Mining Companies Limited Liability Act 1864 (repealed)	27 Vict. No. 228	2 June 1864
An Act to limit the Liability of Mining Companies. (Repealed by Mining Companies Act 1871 (35 Vict. No. 409))
Dog Act 1864 (repealed)	27 Vict. No. 229	2 June 1864
An Act to amend the Law relating to Dogs. (Repealed by Dog Act 1884 (48 Vict. No. 809))
	27 Vict. No. 230	2 June 1864
An Act to make undevised Real Estate distributable amongst next of kin and to provide for the administration of the Estates of Deceased Persons in certain cases.
Prevention of Diseases of Animals Statute 1864 or the Diseases of Animals Prevention Statute 1864 (repealed)	27 Vict. No. 231	2 June 1864
An Act to consolidate and amend the Law relating to the Prevention of Diseases of Animals. (Repealed by Stock Diseases Act 1890 (54 Vict. No. 1141))
Paid Naval and Military Force Act 1864	27 Vict. No. 232	2 June 1864
An Act to provide for the Regulation and Discipline of the paid Naval and Military Forces in the service of Her Majesty's Local Government in Victoria.
Criminal Law and Practice Statute 1864 (repealed)	27 Vict. No. 233	2 June 1864
An Act to consolidate the Law relating to Crimes and the Practice in Criminal Courts. (Repealed by Crimes Act 1890 (54 Vict. No. 1079))

== Sources ==
- "1864 Victorian Historical Acts". AustLII.
