= List of acts of the Parliament of Victoria from 1913 =

This is a list of acts of the Parliament of Victoria, Australia for the year 1913.

== 1913 ==
Short title, or popular name	Citation	Royal assent
Long title
	4 Geo. V. No. 2450	10 July 1913
An Act to apply out of the Consolidated Revenue the sum of One million six hundred and forty-nine thousand three hundred and sixty-six pounds to the service of the year One thousand nine hundred and thirteen and One thousand nine hundred and fourteen.
Royal Agricultural Show Day Act 1913 (repealed)	4 Geo. V. No. 2451	2 September 1913
An Act to amend the Law relating to the Royal Agricultural Show Day. (Repealed by Public Service Act 1915 (6 Geo. V. No. 2713))
	4 Geo. V. No. 2452	2 September 1913
An Act to apply out of the Consolidated Revenue the sum of Two hundred and eighty-three thousand six hundred and seventy-one pounds to the service of the year One thousand nine hundred and twelve and One thousand nine hundred and thirteen.
Sheep Dipping Act 1913 (repealed)	4 Geo. V. No. 2453	2 September 1913
An Act to amend the Sheep Dipping Act 1909. (Note: Sheep Dipping Act 1909 (9 Edw. VII. No. 2216)) (Repealed by Sheep Dipping Act 1915 (6 Geo. V. No. 2727))
Ballaarat Land Act 1913	4 Geo. V. No. 2454	9 September 1913
An Act to enable the Mayor Councillors and Citizens of the City of Ballaarat to transfer to the King part of certain Lands in the Parish of Dowling Forest reserved as a Site for a Public Park.
Willaura Land Act 1913	4 Geo. V. No. 2455	9 September 1913
An Act to revoke the permanent reservation of certain Land in the Parish of Willaura.
	4 Geo. V. No. 2456	9 September 1913
An Act to apply out of the Consolidated Revenue the sum of One million eight hundred and twenty-seven thousand nine hundred and fifty-two pounds to the service of the year One thousand nine hundred and thirteen and One thousand nine hundred and fourteen.
Wire Netting Act 1913 (repealed)	4 Geo. V. No. 2457	23 September 1913
An Act to amend Section Nine of the Wire Netting Act 1909. (Note: Wire Netting Act 1909 (9 Edw. VII. No. 2181)) (Repealed by Vermin Destruction Act 1915 (6 Geo. V. No. 2745))
Registration of Births Deaths and Marriages Act 1913 (repealed)	4 Geo. V. No. 2458	23 September 1913
An Act to further amend the Registration of Births Deaths and Marriages Act 1890. (Note: Registration of Births Deaths and Marriages Act 1890 (54 Vict. No. 1137)) (Repealed by Registration of Births Deaths and Marriages Act 1915 (6 Geo. V. No. 2720))
Marriage Act 1913 (repealed)	4 Geo. V. No. 2459	23 September 1913
An Act to amend the Marriage Act 1902. (Note: Marriage Act 1902 (2 Edw. VII. No. 1809)) (Repealed by Marriage Act 1915 (6 Geo. V. No. 2691))
Oaths Act 1913 (repealed)	4 Geo. V. No. 2460	7 October 1913
An Act to amend the Law relating to Oaths and for other purposes. (Repealed by Evidence Act 1915 (6 Geo. V. No. 2647))
Municipalities' Powers Extension Act 1913 (repealed)	4 Geo. V. No. 2461	14 October 1913
An Act to further amend Section Three of the Municipalities' Powers Extension Act 1907. (Note: Municipalities' Powers Extension Act 1907 (7 Edw. VII. No. 2135)) (Repealed by Local Government Act 1915 (6 Geo. V. No. 2686))
Geelong Harbor Trust Act 1913 (repealed)	4 Geo. V. No. 2462	14 October 1913
An Act to amend the Geelong Harbor Trust Acts. (Repealed by Geelong Harbor Trust Act 1915 (6 Geo. V. No. 2660))
Spirit Merchants' Licences Act 1913 (repealed)	4 Geo. V. No. 2463	14 October 1913
An Act to further amend the Law relating to Spirit Merchants' Licences. (Repealed by Licensing Act 1915 (6 Geo. V. No. 2683))
University Act 1913 (repealed)	4 Geo. V. No. 2464	21 October 1913
An Act to amend certain Sections of the University Act 1890. (Note: University Act 1890 (54 Vict. No. 1151)) (Repealed by University Act 1915 (6 Geo. V. No. 2742))
Fruit and Vegetable Packing and Sale Act 1913 (repealed)	4 Geo. V. No. 2465	21 October 1913
An Act to regulate the Packing and Sale of Fruit and Vegetables and for Other purposes. (Repealed by Fruit Act 1915 (6 Geo. V. No. 2657))
Cressy Land Act 1913	4 Geo. V. No. 2466	25 November 1913
An Act to revoke the Permanent Reservation of certain Land in the Township of Cressy.
Dunolly Land Act 1913 (repealed)	4 Geo. V. No. 2467	25 November 1913
An Act to provide for the Sale of certain Crown Land at Dunolly and for other purposes. (Repealed by Statute Law Revision Act 1984 (No. 10087))
Wonthaggi Land Act 1913 (repealed)	4 Geo. V. No. 2468	25 November 1913
An Act to amend the Wonthaggi Land Act 1912. (Note: Wonthaggi Land Act 1912 (3 Geo. V. No. 2420)) (Repealed by Land Act 1915 (6 Geo. V. No. 2676))
	4 Geo. V. No. 2469	4 December 1913
An Act to apply out of the Consolidated Revenue the sum of Six hundred and sixty-nine thousand and fifty-five pounds to the service of the year One thousand nine hundred and thirteen and One thousand nine hundred and fourteen.
Administration and Probate Duties Act 1913 (repealed)	4 Geo. V. No. 2470	5 December 1913
An Act relating to Duties payable under the Administration and Probate Acts. (Repealed by Administration and Probate Act 1915 (6 Geo. V. No. 2611))
Land Tax Act 1913 (repealed)	4 Geo. V. No. 2471	5 December 1913
An Act to declare the Eate of Land Tax for the Year ending the thirty-first day of December One thousand nine hundred and fourteen. (Repealed by Land Tax Act 1915 (6 Geo. V. No. 2680))
Public Account Advances Amendment Act 1913	4 Geo. V. No. 2472	5 December 1913
An Act to amend the Public Account Advances Act 1910. (Note: Public Account Advances Act 1910 (1 Geo. V. No. 2277))
Savings Banks Act 1913	4 Geo. V. No. 2473	5 December 1913
An Act to amend the Savings Banks Acts.
Victorian Loans (Rates of Interest) Act 1913	4 Geo. V. No. 2474	5 December 1913
An Act relating to the Rates of Interest payable on certain Victorian Government Loans.
Municipal Endowment Act 1913	4 Geo. V. No. 2475	5 December 1913
An Act relating to Municipal Endowment.
Income Tax Act 1913 (repealed)	4 Geo. V. No. 2476	31 December 1913
An Act to declare the rates of Income Tax for the Year ending on the thirty-first day of December One thousand nine hundred and fourteen and to continue the Income Tax Acts. (Repealed by Income Tax Act 1915 (6 Geo. V. No. 2668))
	4 Geo. V. No. 2477	31 December 1913
An Act to apply out of the Consolidated Revenue the sum of One million thre6 hundred and two thousand eight hundred and fifteen pounds to the service of the year One thousand nine hundred and thirteen and One thousand nine hundred and fourteen.

== Sources ==
- "1913 Victorian Historical Acts". AustLII.
