= List of acts of the Parliament of Victoria from 2016 =

This is a list of acts of the Parliament of Victoria, Australia for the year 2016.

== 2016 ==
| Short title, or popular name | Citation | Royal assent |
Long title
| Bail Amendment Act 2016 | No. 1 of 2016 | 16 February 1016 |
An Act to amend the Bail Act 1977 (Note: Bail Act 1977 (No. 9008)) in relation to terrorism related offences, serious offences, failure to answer bail and children, to amend the Children, Youth and Families Act 2005 (Note: Children, Youth and Families Act 2005 (No. 96 of 2005)) in relation to the commencement of criminal proceedings against children and youth offending information, to make consequential amendments to certain Acts and for other purposes.
| Drugs, Poisons and Controlled Substances Amendment Act 2016 | No. 2 of 2016 | 16 February 1016 |
An Act to amend the Drugs, Poisons and Controlled Substances Act 1981 (Note: Drugs, Poisons and Controlled Substances Act 1981 (No. 9719)) to provide for further offences in relation to drugs of dependence, to consequentially amend the Confiscation Act 1997 (Note: Confiscation Act 1997 (No. 108 of 1997)) and other Acts and for other purposes.
| Justice Legislation Further Amendment Act 2016 | No. 3 of 2016 | 16 February 1016 |
An Act to amend the Children, Youth and Families Act 2005, the Constitution Act 1975, (Note: Constitution Act 1975 (No. 8750)) the Coroners Act 2008, (Note: Coroners Act 2008 (No. 77 of 2008)) the County Court Act 1958, (Note: County Court Act 1958 (No. 6230)) the Court Security Act 1980, (Note: Court Security Act 1980 (No. 9499)) the Crimes (Mental Impairment and Unfitness to be Tried) Act 1997, (Note: Crimes (Mental Impairment and Unfitness to be Tried) Act 1997 (No. 65 of 1997)) the Judicial Entitlements Act 2015, (Note: Judicial Entitlements Act 2015 (No. 29 of 2015)) the Magistrates' Court Act 1989, (Note: Magistrates' Court Act 1989 (No. 51 of 1989)) the Supreme Court Act 1986, (Note: Supreme Court Act 1986 (No. 110 of 1986)) the Victims of Crime Assistance Act 1996 (Note: Victims of Crime Assistance Act 1996 (No. 81 of 1996)) and the Victorian Civil and Administrative Tribunal Act 1998, (Note: Victorian Civil and Administrative Tribunal Act 1998 (No. 53 of 1998)) to make consequential or minor amendments to other Acts and for other purposes.
| Relationships Amendment Act 2016 | No. 4 of 2016 | 16 February 1016 |
An Act to amend the Relationships Act 2008 (Note: Relationships Act 2008 (No. 12 of 2008)) and for other purposes.
| Road Legislation Amendment Act 2016 | No. 5 of 2016 | 16 February 1016 |
An Act to amend the Road Safety Act 1986 (Note: Road Safety Act 1986 (No. 127 of 1986)) and other Acts to provide greater flexibility in relation to the certification of analyses conducted in approved laboratories, to make minor amendments to the Road Management Act 2004, (Note: Road Management Act 2004 (No. 12 of 2004)) to make other amendments to the Road Safety Act 1986 relating to the licensing of drivers and for other purposes.
| Assisted Reproductive Treatment Amendment Act 2016 | No. 6 of 2016 | 1 March 2016 |
An Act to amend the Assisted Reproductive Treatment Act 2008 (Note: Assisted Reproductive Treatment Act 2008 (No. 76 of 2008)) to enable persons born as the result of the use of gametes donated before 1 January 1998 to obtain information about donors without consent, to provide for the lodgement of contact preferences, to further provide for the keeping of the Central Register and the Voluntary Register, to make consequential amendments to the Births, Deaths and Marriages Registration Act 1996 (Note: Births, Deaths and Marriages Registration Act 1996 (No. 43 of 1996)) and for other purposes.
| Kardinia Park Stadium Act 2016 | No. 7 of 2016 | 1 March 2016 |
An Act to establish the Kardinia Park Stadium Trust to administer certain land and facilities at Kardinia Park, to provide the functions and powers of the Trust, to provide power to re-reserve land at Kardinia Park, and to make consequential amendments to the Geelong (Kardinia Park) Land Act 1950 (Note: Geelong (Kardinia Park) Land Act 1950 (No. 5510)) and other Acts and for other purposes.
| Children Legislation Amendment Act 2016 | No. 8 of 2016 | 15 March 2016 |
An Act to amend the Children, Youth and Families Act 2005 to improve the operation of that Act and to amend the Commission for Children and Young People Act 2012 (Note: Commission for Children and Young People Act 2012 (No. 79 of 2012)) in relation to the disclosure of information under that Act and for other purposes.
| Education and Training Reform Amendment (Victorian Institute of Teaching) Act 2016 | No. 9 of 2016 | 15 March 2016 |
An Act to amend the Education and Training Reform Act 2006 (Note: Education and Training Reform Act 2006 (No. 24 of 2006)) to provide power for the Victorian Institute of Teaching to suspend the registration of a registered teacher if there is an unacceptable risk of harm to children, to change the membership requirements of the Council of the Victorian Institute of Teaching and for other purposes.
| Delivering Victorian Infrastructure (Port of Melbourne Lease Transaction) Act 2016 | No. 10 of 2016 | 22 March 2016 |
An Act to authorise and facilitate the leasing of land in the port of Melbourne and disposal of assets of the Port of Melbourne Corporation to a private sector entity, to establish the Victorian Transport Fund, to make related amendments to the Transport Integration Act 2010, (Note: Transport Integration Act 2010 (No. 6 of 2010)) the Port Management Act 1995, (Note: Port Services Act 1995 (No. 82 of 1995)) the Marine Safety Act 2010, (Note: Marine Safety Act 2010 (No. 65 of 2010)) the Essential Services Commission Act 2001 (Note: Essential Services Commission Act 2001 (No. 62 of 2001)) and consequential amendments to other Acts and for other purposes.
| Aboriginal Heritage Amendment Act 2016 | No. 11 of 2016 | 5 April 2016 |
An Act to amend the Aboriginal Heritage Act 2006, (Note: Aboriginal Heritage Act 2006 (No. 16 of 2006)) the Borrowing and Investment Powers Act 1987, (Note: Borrowing and Investment Powers Act 1987 (No. 13 of 1987)) the Cemeteries and Crematoria Act 2003 (Note: Cemeteries and Crematoria Act 2003 (No. 80 of 2003)) and the Coroners Act 2008 to improve the reporting requirements in relation to Aboriginal cultural heritage, to include provisions regarding Aboriginal intangible heritage, to establish an Aboriginal Cultural Heritage Fund and to provide for the further protection of Aboriginal cultural heritage and for other purposes.
| Crown Land Legislation Amendment (Canadian Regional Park and Other Matters) Act 2016 | No. 12 of 2016 | 5 April 2016 |
An Act to amend the Crown Land (Reserves) Act 1978, (Note: Crown Land (Reserves) Act 1978 (No. 9212)) the Forests Act 1958, (Note: Forests Act 1958 (No. 6254)) the Land Act 1958, (Note: Land Act 1958 (No. 6284)) the Livestock Disease Control Act 1994, (Note: Livestock Disease Control Act 1994 (No. 115 of 1994)) the Mineral Resources (Sustainable Development) Act 1990, (Note: Mineral Resources Development Act 1990 (No. 92 of 1990)) the National Parks Act 1975 (Note: National Parks Act 1975 (No. 8702)) and the Wildlife Act 1975 (Note: Wildlife Act 1975 (No. 8699)) and for other purposes.
| Land (Revocation of Reservations) Act 2016 | No. 13 of 2016 | 5 April 2016 |
An Act to revoke permanent reservations of certain land, to provide for reservations of certain land for specified purposes and for other purposes.
| Local Government (Greater Geelong City Council) Act 2016 | No. 14 of 2016 | 15 April 2016 |
An Act to dismiss the Greater Geelong City Council and provide for a general election for that Council, to make related amendments to the City of Greater Geelong Act 1993 (Note: City of Greater Geelong Act 1993 (No. 16 of 1993)) and for other purposes.
| Building Legislation Amendment (Consumer Protection) Act 2016 | No. 15 of 2016 | 19 April 2016 |
An Act to amend the Domestic Building Contracts Act 1995 (Note: Domestic Building Contracts and Tribunal Act 1995 (No. 91 of 1995)) and the Building Act 1993 (Note: Building Act 1993 (No. 126 of 1993)) to enhance consumer protection in relation to domestic building work and to otherwise improve the operation of those Acts, to make consequential amendments to the Victorian Civil and Administrative Tribunal Act 1998 and for other purposes.
| Judicial Commission of Victoria Act 2016 | No. 16 of 2016 | 19 April 2016 |
An Act to amend the Constitution Act 1975 to establish the Judicial Commission of Victoria under that Act, to provide for investigations into judicial officers and nonjudicial members of VCAT, to make consequential and other amendments to other Acts and for other purposes.
| Racing and Other Acts Amendment (Greyhound Racing and Welfare Reform) Act 2016 | No. 17 of 2016 | 19 April 2016 |
An Act to amend the Racing Act 1958 (Note: Racing Act 1958 (No. 6353)) in relation to Greyhound Racing Victoria, the GRV Racing Appeals and Disciplinary Board, the Racing Integrity Commissioner, the use of animals as lures in greyhound races, certain enforcement powers and the use or disclosure of information, to amend the Domestic Animals Act 1994 (Note: Domestic (Feral and Nuisance) Animals Act 1994 (No. 81 of 1994)) in relation to codes of practice for the keeping of certain greyhounds and fees to be given by Greyhound Racing Victoria to the Treasurer, to amend the Prevention of Cruelty to Animals Act 1986 (Note: Prevention of Cruelty to Animals Act 1986 (No. 46 of 1986)) in relation to the time for charging certain offences under that Act and for other purposes.
| Transport Accident Amendment Act 2016 | No. 18 of 2016 | 19 April 2016 |
An Act to amend the Transport Accident Act 1986 (Note: Transport Accident Act 1986 (No. 111 of 1986)) to repeal certain subsections of that Act inserted in 2013 and for other purposes.
| Victoria Police Amendment (Merit-based Transfer) Act 2016 | No. 19 of 2016 | 19 April 2016 |
An Act to amend the Victoria Police Act 2013 (Note: Victoria Police Act 2013 (No. 81 of 2013)) in relation to the transfer of certain police officers and for other purposes.
| Access to Medicinal Cannabis Act 2016 | No. 20 of 2016 | 26 April 2016 |
An Act to provide for medicinal use of products derived from cannabis by establishing a scheme for the lawful manufacture of those products and the lawful use of those products by a limited class of Victorians, to consequentially amend the Drugs, Poisons and Controlled Substances Act 1981 and to make related amendments to certain other Acts and for other purposes.
| Sex Offenders Registration Amendment Act 2016 | No. 21 of 2016 | |
| Health Complaints Act 2016 | No. 22 of 2016 | 3 May 2016 |
An Act to provide for a complaints process and other processes about health service provision and related matters, to establish the office of Health Complaints Commissioner and the Health Complaints Commissioner Advisory Council, to repeal the Health Services (Conciliation and Review) Act 1987, (Note: Health Services (Conciliation and Review) Act 1987 (No. 25 of 1987)) to make minor and consequential amendments to other Acts and for other purposes.
| Consumer Acts and Other Acts Amendment Act 2016 | No. 23 of 2016 | |
| National Electricity (Victoria) Further Amendment Act 2016 | No. 24 of 2016 | |
| Occupational Licensing National Law Repeal Act 2016 | No. 25 of 2016 | |
| Rooming House Operators Act 2016 | No. 26 of 2016 | 10 May 2016 |
An Act to improve the operation of rooming houses by establishing a licensing scheme for rooming house operators and to make consequential amendments to the Australian Consumer Law and Fair Trading Act 2012, (Note: Australian Consumer Law and Fair Trading Act 2012 (No. 21 of 2012)) the Business Licensing Authority Act 1998, (Note: Business Licensing Authority Act 1998 (No. 49 of 1998)) the Estate Agents Act 1980 (Note: Estate Agents Act 1980 (No. 9428)) and the Residential Tenancies Act 1997 (Note: Residential Tenancies Act 1997 (No. 109 of 1997)) and for other purposes.
| Confiscation and Other Matters Amendment Act 2016 | No. 27 of 2016 | |
| Crimes Legislation Amendment Act 2016 | No. 28 of 2016 | |
| Fines Reform and Infringements Acts Amendment Act 2016 | No. 29 of 2016 | |
| Integrity and Accountability Legislation Amendment (A Stronger System) Act 2016 | No. 30 of 2016 | |
| Land (Revocation of Reservations - Metropolitan Land) Act 2016 | No. 31 of 2016 | |
| Serious Sex Offenders (Detention and Supervision) Amendment (Community Safety) Act 2016 | No. 32 of 2016 | |
| Transport (Compliance and Miscellaneous) Amendment (Public Safety) Act 2016 | No. 33 of 2016 | |
| Witness Protection Amendment Act 2016 | No. 34 of 2016 | |
| Appropriation (2016-2017) Act 2016 | No. 35 of 2016 | |
| Appropriation (Parliament 2016-2017) Act 2016 | No. 36 of 2016 | |
| House Contracts Guarantee Repeal Act 2016 | No. 37 of 2016 | |
| Justice Legislation (Evidence and Other Acts) Amendment Act 2016 | No. 38 of 2016 | |
| Rural Assistance Schemes Act 2016 | No. 39 of 2016 | |
| State Taxation and Other Acts Amendment Act 2016 | No. 40 of 2016 | |
| Treasury and Finance Legislation Amendment Act 2016 | No. 41 of 2016 | |
| Education and Training Reform Amendment (Miscellaneous) Act 2016 | No. 42 of 2016 | |
| Gene Technology Amendment Act 2016 | No. 43 of 2016 | |
| National Parks and Victorian Environmental Assessment Council Acts Amendment Act 2016 | No. 44 of 2016 | |
| Road Management Amendment (Bus Stop Delivery Powers) Act 2016 | No. 45 of 2016 | |
| Local Government Amendment Act 2016 | No. 46 of 2016 | |
| Crimes Amendment (Sexual Offences) Act 2016 | No. 47 of 2016 | |
| Primary Industries Legislation Amendment Act 2016 | No. 48 of 2016 | |
| Livestock Disease Control Amendment Act 2016 | No. 49 of 2016 | |
| Crimes Amendment (Carjacking and Home Invasion) Act 2016 | No. 50 of 2016 | |
| Crown Land Legislation Amendment Act 2016 | No. 51 of 2016 | |
| Melbourne and Olympic Parks Amendment Act 2016 | No. 52 of 2016 | |
| National Domestic Violence Order Scheme Act 2016 | No. 53 of 2016 | 18 October 2016 |
An Act to provide for a national recognition scheme for domestic violence orders, to make consequential amendments to the Family Violence Protection Act 2008 (Note: Family Violence Protection Act 2008 (No. 52 of 2008)) and other Acts and for other purposes.
| Police and Justice Legislation Amendment (Miscellaneous) Act 2016 | No. 54 of 2016 | |
| Tobacco Amendment Act 2016 | No. 55 of 2016 | |
| Victorian Funds Management Corporation Amendment Act 2016 | No. 56 of 2016 | |
| Corrections Legislation Amendment Act 2016 | No. 57 of 2016 | |
| Estate Agents Amendment (Underquoting) Act 2016 | No. 58 of 2016 | |
| Land (Revocation of Reservations - Regional Victoria Land) Act 2016 | No. 59 of 2016 | |
| Legal Profession Uniform Law Application Amendment Act 2016 | No. 60 of 2016 | |
| Melbourne College of Divinity Amendment Act 2016 | No. 61 of 2016 | 2 November 2016 |
An Act to amend the Melbourne College of Divinity Act 1910 (Note: Melbourne College of Divinity Act 1910 (1 Geo. V. No. 2275)) to provide for the title, operation and status of the University of Divinity and for other purposes.
| Alpine Resorts Legislation Amendment Act 2016 | No. 62 of 2016 | |
| Child Wellbeing and Safety Amendment (Oversight and Enforcement of Child Safe Standards) Act 2016 | No. 63 of 2016 | |
| Powers of Attorney Amendment Act 2016 | No. 64 of 2016 | |
| Sentencing (Community Correction Order) and Other Acts Amendment Act 2016 | No. 65 of 2016 | |
| State Taxation Acts Further Amendment Act 2016 | No. 66 of 2016 | |
| Traditional Owner Settlement Amendment Act 2016 | No. 67 of 2016 | |
| Victorian Fisheries Authority Act 2016 | No. 68 of 2016 | 15 November 2016 |
An Act to establish the Victorian Fisheries Authority, to make amendments to the Fisheries Act 1995 (Note: Fisheries Act 1995 (No. 92 of 1995)) to enable the Victorian Fisheries Authority and its chief executive officer to perform or exercise regulatory functions or powers under that Act, to make further consequential amendments to the Conservation, Forests and Lands Act 1987, (Note: Conservation, Forests and Lands Act 1987 (No. 41 of 1987)) the Fisheries Act 1995 and other Acts and for other purposes.
| Medical Treatment Planning and Decisions Act 2016 | No. 69 of 2016 | 29 November 2016 |
An Act to provide for a scheme of medical treatment planning, to provide for the making of medical treatment decisions on behalf of, and the administration of medical research procedures to, persons who do not have decision-making capacity, to repeal the Medical Treatment Act 1988, (Note: Medical Treatment Act 1988 (No. 41 of 1988)) to amend the Mental Health Act 2014 (Note: Mental Health Act 2014 (No. 26 of 2014)) in relation to approval procedures for electroconvulsive treatment of adults who do not have capacity, to make consequential amendments to that and other Acts and for other purposes.
| Road Legislation Further Amendment Act 2016 | No. 70 of 2016 | |
| Transport (Compliance and Miscellaneous) Amendment (Abolition of the Penalty Fares Scheme) Act 2016 | No. 71 of 2016 | |
| Working with Children Amendment Act 2016 | No. 72 of 2016 | |
| Compensation Legislation Amendment Act 2016 | No. 73 of 2016 | |
| Family Violence Reform Implementation Monitor Act 2016 | No. 74 of 2016 | |
| Housing Amendment (Victorian Housing Register and Other Matters) Act 2016 | No. 75 of 2016 | |
| Justice Legislation Amendment (Parole Reform and Other Matters) Act 2016 | No. 76 of 2016 | |

== Sources ==
- "Acts as made: 2016". Victoria Legislation.
