= List of acts of the Parliament of Victoria from 1959 =

This is a list of acts of the Parliament of Victoria, Australia for the year 1959.

== 1959 ==
Short title, or popular name	Citation	Royal assent
Long title
Police Offences (Trap Shooting) Act 1958 (repealed)	No. 6488	2 January 1959
An Act to amend Section Sixty-one of the Police Offences Act 1957. (Note: Police Offences Act 1957 (No. 6069); this was amended by the Sessional Acts Revision Act 1958 (No. 6489) to a reference to the Police Offences Act 1958 (No. 6337)) (Repealed by Statute Law Revision (Repeals) Act 1982 (No. 9863))
Sessional Acts Revision Act 1958 (repealed)	No. 6489	2 January 1959
To adapt certain References in certain Acts passed during the First Session of the Forty-first Parliament to the Provisions of the Consolidating Acts passed during the said Session of the said Parliament, and for other purposes. (Repealed by Statute Law Revision (Repeals) Act 1982 (No. 9863))
Water (Contracts) Act 1959 (repealed)	No. 6490	24 March 1959
An Act to empower the State Rivers and Water Supply Commission to enter into certain Contracts with Municipalities and Public Bodies. (Repealed by Statute Law Revision (Repeals) Act 1982 (No. 9863))
Property Law (Amendment) Act 1959 (repealed)	No. 6491	7 April 1959
An Act to amend Section One hundred and seventy-two of the Property Law Act 1958. (Note: Property Law Act 1958 (No. 6344)) (Repealed by Statute Law Revision (Repeals) Act 1982 (No. 9863))
Agricultural Education (Amendment) Act 1959 (repealed)	No. 6492	14 April 1959
An Act to amend the Agricultural Education Act 1958. (Note: Agricultural Education Act 1958 (No. 6195)) (Repealed by Statute Law Revision (Repeals) Act 1982 (No. 9863))
Swan Hill Railway Land Act 1959 (repealed)	No. 6493	14 April 1959
An Act to authorize the Grant of certain Land at Swan Hill to The Victorian Railways Commissioners and the subsequent Sale thereof, and for other purposes. (Repealed by Statute Law Revision (Repeals) Act 1982 (No. 9863))
Stamps (Amendment) Act 1959 (repealed)	No. 6494	28 April 1959
An Act to amend Sub-section (14) of Section Two of the Stamps (Amendment) Act 1958 (Note: Stamps (Amendment) Act 1958 (No. 6450)) and the Stamps Act 1958. (Note: Stamps Act 1958 (No. 6375)) (Repealed by Statute Law Revision (Repeals) Act 1982 (No. 9863))
Justices (Amendment) Act 1959 (Note: Two acts were passed with the short title 'Justices (Amendment) Act 1959', No. 6495 and No. 6581.) (repealed)	No. 6495	28 April 1959
(Repealed by Statute Law Revision (Repeals) Act 1982 (No. 9863))
	No. 6496	28 April 1959
An Act to apply out of the Consolidated Revenue the sum of Twenty-eight million six hundred and thirty-four thousand nine hundred and thirty-eight pounds to the service of the year One thousand nine hundred and fifty-nine and One thousand nine hundred and sixty. (Repealed by Statute Law Revision (Repeals) Act 1982 (No. 9863))
Aborigines (Houses) Act 1959	No. 6498	5 May 1959
An Act to amend Section Seven of the Aborigines Act 1958. (Note: Aborigines Act 1958 (No. 6190))
University (Honorary Degrees) Act 1959 (repealed)	No. 6502	5 May 1959
An Act to amend Section Nineteen of the University Act 1958. (Note: University Act 1958 (No. 6405)) (Repealed by Statute Law Revision (Repeals) Act 1982 (No. 9863))
Constitution Act Amendment (Parliamentary Salaries) Act 1959 (repealed)	No. 6519	12 May 1959
An Act to amend Parts II., VI. and VII. of The Constitution Act Amendment Act 1958. (Note: Constitution Act Amendment Act 1958 (No. 6224)) (Repealed by Statute Law Revision (Repeals) Act 1982 (No. 9863))
Bread Industry Act 1959 (repealed)	No. 6529	12 May 1959
An Act relating to the Bread Industry. (Repealed by Legislation Reform (Repeals No. 3) Act 2008 (No. 53 of 2008))
Hire-Purchase Act 1959	No. 6531	12 May 1959
An Act relating to the Form and Content of Hire-Purchase Agreements to regulate the Rights and Duties of Parties to such Agreements, and for other purposes.
Land Settlement Act 1959 (repealed)	No. 6534	19 May 1959
An Act relating to Land Settlement and for other purposes. (Repealed by Rural Finance Act 1988 (No. 44 of 1988))
	No. 6537	29 September 1959
An Act to apply out of the Consolidated Revenue the sum of Thirty-one million six hundred and fifty-five thousand five hundred and eighteen pounds to the service of the year One thousand nine hundred and fifty-nine and One thousand nine hundred and sixty. (Repealed by Statute Law Revision (Repeals) Act 1982 (No. 9863))
Amendments Incorporation (Extension) Act 1959 (repealed)	No. 6541	7 October 1959
An Act to make Provision for the Incorporation of Amendments effected by Proclamations Orders and other Instruments in Reprints of Amended Acts. (Repealed by Statute Law Revision (Repeals) Act 1982 (No. 9863))
Statute Law Revision Act 1959 (repealed)	No. 6547	20 October 1959
An Act to revise the Statute Law. (Repealed by Statute Law Revision (Repeals) Act 1982 (No. 9863))
	No. 6558	4 November 1959
An Act to apply out of the Consolidated Revenue the sum of One million three hundred and ninety-five thousand one hundred and twelve pounds to the service of the year One thousand nine hundred and fifty-eight and One thousand nine hundred and fifty-nine. (Repealed by Statute Law Revision (Repeals) Act 1982 (No. 9863))
Alphington to East Preston Railway Construction (Housing) Act 1959	No. 6562	17 November 1959
An Act to repeal the Alphington to East Preston Railway Construction Act 1948 (Note: Alphington to East Preston Railway Construction Act 1948 (No. 5345)) and to authorize the Housing Commission to deal with Land acquired by it under Section Ten of that Act.
Registration of Births Deaths and Marriages Act 1959 (repealed)	No. 6564	24 November 1959
An Act to consolidate and amend the Law relating to the Registration of Births Deaths and Marriages. (Repealed by Births, Deaths and Marriages Registration Act 1996 (No. 43))
Water Supply Loan Application Act 1959 (repealed)	No. 6566	24 November 1959
An Act to sanction the Issue and Application of Loan Money for Works and other Purposes relating to Irrigation Water Supply Drainage Sewerage Flood Protection and River Improvement, and for other purposes. (Repealed by Treasury Legislation (Repeal) Act 2005 (No. 73 of 2005))
Justices (Amendment) Act 1959 (repealed)	No. 6581	8 December 1959
An Act to amend Sections Eighty-six and Eighty-seven of the Justices Act 1958. (Note: Justices Act 1958 (No. 6282)) (Repealed by Statute Law Revision (Repeals) Act 1982 (No. 9863))
Mental Health Act 1959	No. 6605	15 December 1959
An Act to consolidate and amend the Law relating to Mental Health and for other purposes.
	No. 6606	22 December 1959
An Act to apply a sum out of the Consolidated Revenue to the service of the year ending on the thirtieth day of June One thousand nine hundred and sixty and to appropriate the Supplies granted in this and the last preceding Session of Parliament. (Repealed by Statute Law Revision (Repeals) Act 1982 (No. 9863))
Bendigo Land Act 1959	No.	
Broadmeadows (Rating on Unimproved Values) Act 1959	No.	
Cemeteries (Investment of Funds) Act 1959	No.	
Cemeteries Act 1959	No.	
Coal Mines (Pensions) Act 1959	No.	
Coroners (Amendment) Act 1959	No.	
Country Fire Authority (Amendment) Act 1959	No.	
Country Roads (Amendment) Act 1959	No.	
Country Roads (Offices and Buildings) Act 1959	No.	
Crimes (Penalties) Act 1959	No.	
Crimes (Sentences and Parole) Act 1959	No.	
Distribution of Population (Joint Committee) Act 1959	No.	
Dromana Land (Arthur's Seat Public Park) Act 1959	No.	
Entertainments Tax (Reduction) Act 1959	No.	
Evidence (Amendment) Act 1959	No.	
Fences (Amendment) Act 1959	No.	
Fisheries (Amendment) Act 1959	No.	
Forests (Pulpwood Agreement) Act 1959	No.	
Frustrated Contracts Act 1959	No.	
Game (Amendment) Act 1959	No.	
Gas and Fuel Corporation (Colonial Gas Association Undertakings) Act 1959	No.	
Geelong Trades Hall Council (Trustees) Act 1959	No.	
Hairdressers Registration (Amendment) Act 1959	No.	
Health (Amendment) Act 1959	No.	
Health Act 1959	No.	
Hepburn Springs Land Act 1959	No.	
Home Finance (Financial) Act 1959	No.	
Imprisonment of Fraudulent Debtors (Depositions) Act 1959	No.	
Labour and Industry (Amendment) Act 1959	No.	
Labour and Industry (Motor Car Shops) Act 1959	No.	
Labour and Industry (Retail Trading Hours) Act 1959	No.	
Land (Charges) Act 1959	No.	
Land (Plantation Areas) Act 1959	No.	
Land (Special Grants) Act 1959	No.	
Land Tax (Rates) Act 1959	No.	
Landlord and Tenant (Amendment) Act 1959	No.	
Landlord and Tenant (Fair Rents) Act 1959	No.	
Legal Profession Practice (Amendment) Act 1959	No.	
Lifts and Cranes Act 1959	No.	
Local Government (Amendment) Act 1959	No.	
Local Government (Councillors' Declarations) Act 1959	No.	
Local Government (Municipalities Assistance Fund) Act 1959	No.	
Local Government Act 1959	No.	
Marriage (Fees) Act 1959	No.	
Medical Act 1959	No.	
Melbourne and Metropolitan Board of Works (Amendment) Act 1959	No.	
Melbourne and Metropolitan Board of Works (Reconstitution) Act 1959	No.	
Melbourne and Metropolitan Tramways (Amendment) Act 1959	No.	
Melbourne and Richmond Lands Act 1959	No.	
Melbourne Harbor Trust (Commissioners) Act 1959	No.	
Metropolitan Fire Brigades (Borrowing Powers) Act 1959	No.	
Milk Board (Amendment) Act 1959	No.	
Milk Board (Milk Shops) Act 1959	No.	
Money Lenders (Amendment) Act 1959	No.	
Motor Car (Amendment) Act 1959	No.	
Motor Car (Hours of Driving) Act 1959	No.	
Motor Car (Insurance Surcharge) Act 1959	No.	
Motor Car Act 1959	No.	
National Art Gallery and Cultural Centre (Amendment) Act 1959	No.	
Nurses Act 1959	No.	
Police Offences (Betting) Act 1959	No.	
Police Offences (Penalties) Act 1959	No.	
Police Regulation (Delegation of Powers) Act 1959	No.	
Portland Harbor Trust (Amendment) Act 1959	No.	
Public Service (Amendment) Act 1959	No.	
Public Works Committee (Amendment) Act 1959	No.	
Public Works Loan Application Act 1959	No.	
Racing (Meetings) Act 1959	No.	
Railway Loan Application Act 1959	No.	
Revenue Deficit Funding Act 1959	No.	
Revocation and Excision of Crown Reservations Act 1959	No.	
Road Traffic (Infringements) Act 1959	No.	
Soldier Settlement (Amendment) Act 1959	No.	
Stamps Act 1959	No.	
State Electricity Commission (Hazelwood Power Station) Act 1959	No.	
State Electricity Commission (Tourist Areas) Act 1959	No.	
State Forests Loan Application Act 1959	No.	
State Savings Bank (Amendment) Act 1959	No.	
Stock Diseases (Amendment) Act 1959	No.	
Superannuation (Amendment) Act 1959	No.	
Superannuation Act 1959	No.	
Teaching Service (Amendment) Act 1959	No.	
Tourist (Amendment) Act 1959	No.	
Town and Country Planning (Amendment) Act 1959	No.	
Transfer of Land (Amendment) Act 1959	No.	
Trustee (Amendment) Act 1959	No.	
Trustee (Mortgages) Act 1959	No.	
Vegetation and Vine Diseases (Amendment) Act 1959	No.	
Vermin and Noxious Weeds Act 1959	No.	
War Veterans' Homes Trust Act 1959	No.	
Water (Irrigation Districts) Act 1959	No.	
Water (Irrigation) Act 1959	No.	
Water (Land Reclamation) Act 1959	No.	

== Sources ==
- "1959 Victorian Historical Acts". AustLII.
