= List of acts of the Parliament of Victoria from 1893 =

This is a list of acts of the Parliament of Victoria, Australia for the year 1893.

== 1893 ==
Short title, or popular name	Citation	Royal assent
Long title
Federal Council Referring Act (Victoria) 1892 (Note: Although given a short title ending '...Act 1892' this act was passed in the year 1893.) (repealed)	56 Vict. No. 1284	19 January 1893
An Act to refer certain matters to the Federal Council of Australasia for the exercise of Legislative Authority thereon. (Repealed by Statute Law Repeals Act 2007 (No. 21 of 2007))
Duties of Customs Act 1892	56 Vict. No. 1285	19 January 1893
An Act for granting to Her Majesty certain Duties of Customs and Excise.
	56 Vict. No. 1286	25 January 1893
An Act to apply out of the Consolidated Revenue the sum of Eight hundred and sixty-two thousand eight hundred and seventy pounds to the service of the year One thousand eight hundred and ninety-two and ninety-three.
Debentures Conversion Act 1893	56 Vict. No. 1287	17 February 1893
An Act to provide for the conversion into Victorian Government Inscribed Stock of certain Debentures redeemable in London, or to issue Stock for their Redemption.
Railway Lands Acquisition Act 1893 (repealed)	56 Vict. No. 1288	17 February 1893
An Act to make better provision for the acquisition of Lands required for the Construction of Lines of Railway and for other purposes. (Repealed by Railway Lands Acquisition Act 1915 (6 Geo. V. No. 2715))
Municipal Subsidy Act 1893	56 Vict. No. 1289	27 February 1893
An Act to Reduce the Municipal Subsidy for the Year One thousand eight hundred and ninety-three.
Trusts Act 1893	56 Vict. No. 1290	27 February 1893
An Act to amend the Law relating to Trustees.
	56 Vict. No. 1291	27 February 1893
An Act to amend the Law in respect of the Sale and Purchase of Shares in Banking Companies. (Repealed by Instruments Act 1915 (6 Geo. V. No. 2672))
Natimuk and Goroke Railway Construction Act 1893	56 Vict. No. 1292	27 February 1893
An Act to authorize the construction by the State of a Line of Railway from Natimuk to Goroke.
Nathalia and Picola Railway Construction Act 1893	56 Vict. No. 1293	27 February 1893
An Act to authorize the construction by the State of a Line of Railway from Nathalia to Picola.
Coal Mines Railway Construction Further Amendment Act 1893	56 Vict. No. 1294	27 February 1893
An Act to further amend the Coal Mines Railway Construction Act 1891. (Note: Coal Mines Railway Construction Act 1891 (55 Vict. No. 1240))
	56 Vict. No. 1295	3 March 1893
An Act to apply a sum out of the Consolidated Revenue to the service of the year ending on the thirtieth day of June One thousand eight hundred and ninety-three and to appropriate the Supplies granted in this Session of Parliament.
Victorian Debentures Redemption and Loan Act 1893	56 Vict. No. 1296	3 March 1893
An Act to authorize the Raising of Money for the Redemption or Payment of certain Debentures and for other purposes.
Kew Municipal Loan Act 1893	56 Vict. No. 1297	3 March 1893
An Act to authorize the Borough of Kew to construct certain permanent Works and Undertakings in lieu of certain other permanent Works and Undertakings.
Licensing Act 1893	56 Vict. No. 1298	3 March 1893
An Act to authorize the Sale of Liquors at the Intercolonial Wine Fruit Grain and General Products Exhibition 1893.
Heidelberg and Eltham Railway Construction Act 1893	56 Vict. No. 1299	3 March 1893
An Act to authorize the construction by the State of a Line of Railway from Heidelberg to Eltham.
Railway Loan Application Act 1893	56 Vict. No. 1300	3 March 1893
An Act to apply out of "The Victorian Stock Act 1891 Account" or temporarily out of "The Public Account" certain Sums of Money for Railway Works and other purposes.
Water Supply Loans Application Act 1893	56 Vict. No. 1301	3 March 1893
An Act to sanction the issue and application of certain sums of money as Loans for Water Supply and Irrigation Works in the Country Districts and for other purposes.
Teachers Act 1893 (repealed)	56 Vict. No. 1302	3 March 1893
An Act to amend the provisions of the Public Service Act 1890 (Note: Public Service Act 1890 (54 Vict. No. 1133)) relating to State School Teachers. (Repealed by Public Service Act 1915 (6 Geo. V. No. 2713))
Births Deaths and Marriages Transfer Act 1893 (repealed)	56 Vict. No. 1303	3 March 1893
An Act relating to the transfer of certain powers and duties from the Registrar-General to the Government Statist. (Repealed by Registration of Births Deaths and Marriages Act 1915 (6 Geo. V. No. 2720))
Mildura Rating Act 1893	56 Vict. No. 1304	3 March 1893
An Act to facilitate the carrying out certain of the provisions of The Waterworks Construction Encouragement Act 1886. (Note: Waterworks Construction Encouragement Act 1886 (50 Vict. No. 910))
Debentures Conversion Amendment Act 1893	57 Vict. No. 1305	17 July 1893
An Act to amend the Debentures Conversion Act 1893. (Note: Debentures Conversion Act 1893 (56 Vict. No. 1287))
Constitution Act Amendment Act 1893 (repealed)	57 Vict. No. 1306	19 July 1893
An Act relating to the Advertising of Persons objected to on Electoral Lists. (Repealed by Constitution Act Amendment Act 1915 (6 Geo. V. No. 2632))
	57 Vict. No. 1307	27 July 1893
An Act to apply out of the Consolidated Revenue the sum of Forty-seven thousand one hundred and seven pounds to the service of the year One thousand eight hundred and ninety-two and ninety-three and the sum of One million three hundred and fifty-three thousand two hundred and ninety-six pounds to the service of the year One thousand eight hundred and ninety-three and ninety-four.
Ministers' Members' and Officers' Salaries and Reimbursement Retrenchment Act 1892	56 Vict. No. 1308	14 August 1893 (Note: This act was reserved for approval by Her Majesty.)
An Act providing for the Reduction for the Financial Year ending on the thirtieth day of June One thousand eight hundred and ninety-three of the Salaries and Reimbursements payable to Responsible Ministers Members of the Legislative Assembly and certain Public Officers.
Members' Reimbursement Retrenchment Act 1893	57 Vict. No. 1309	29 August 1893
An Act providing for the Reduction for Three Years of the Reimbursement of Expenses payable to Members of the Legislative Assembly.
Saint Kilda Loan Act 1893	57 Vict. No. 1310	29 August 1893
An Act to authorize the City of Saint Kilda to construct certain permanent Works and Undertakings in lieu of certain other permanent Works and Undertakings.
Settlement of Lands Act 1893 (repealed)	57 Vict. No. 1311	31 August 1893
An Act to provide for the establishment of Village Communities, Homestead Associations, and Labour Colonies. (Repealed by Land Act 1901 (1 Edw. VII. No. 1749))
Dimboola and Boort Railways Construction Act 1893	57 Vict. No. 1312	11 September 1893
An Act to authorize the Construction by the State of Lines of Railway from Dimboola and Boort.
Public Service Retrenchment Act 1893	57 Vict. No. 1313	11 September 1893
An Act providing for the Reduction during Three Years of the Salaries of certain Public 0fficers.
Land Sales by Auction Fund Reduction Act 1893	57 Vict. No. 1314	26 September 1893
An Act to amend the Land Sales by Auction Fund Act 1891. (Note: Land Sales by Auction Fund Act 1891 (55 Vict. No. 1213))
Marine Act 1893 (repealed)	57 Vict. No. 1315	26 September 1893
An Act to amend the Marine Act 1890. (Note: Marine Act 1890 (54 Vict. No. 1165)) (Repealed by Marine Act 1915 (6 Geo. V. No. 2688))
Beulah and Hopetoun Railway Act 1893	57 Vict. No. 1316	26 September 1893
An Act to amend the Beulah and Hopetoun Railway Act 1892. (Note: Beulah and Hopetoun Railway Act 1892 (56 Vict. No. 1260))
Provident Societies Act 1893 (repealed)	57 Vict. No. 1317	26 September 1893
An Act to amend the Provident Societies Act 1890. (Note: Provident Societies Act 1890 (54 Vict. No. 1131)) (Repealed by Provident Societies Act 1915 (6 Geo. V. No. 2712))
Duties of Customs Act 1893	57 Vict. No. 1318	26 September 1893
An Act for granting to Her Majesty certain Duties of Customs.
Municipal Endowment Reduction Act 1893	57 Vict. No. 1319	26 September 1893
An Act to Reduce the Municipal Endowment.
	57 Vict. No. 1320	10 October 1893
An Act to apply out of the Consolidated Revenue the sum of Eight hundred and one thousand five hundred and seventy-four pounds to the service of the year One thousand eight hundred and ninety-three and ninety-four.
Duties of Customs Act 1893 (No. 2)	57 Vict. No. 1321	13 October 1893
An Act for granting to Her Majesty further Duties of Customs.
Municipal Overdrafts (Indemnity) Act 1893	57 Vict. No. 1322	13 October 1893
An Act to indemnify the Councillors of various Municipalities for Borrowing Moneys by Overdrafts on Bankers for the purposes of their Municipalities contrary to the provisions of the Local Government Act 1890 (Note: Local Government Act 1890 (54 Vict. No. 1112)) and for other purposes.
Audit Act 1893 (repealed)	57 Vict. No. 1323	19 October 1893
An Act to amend the Audit Act 1890. (Note: Audit Act 1890 (54 Vict. No. 1066)) (Repealed by Audit Act 1915 (6 Geo. V. No. 2516))
Public Service Act 1893 (repealed)	57 Vict. No. 1324	19 October 1893
An Act to further amend the Public Service Act 1890. (Repealed by Public Service Act 1915 (6 Geo. V. No. 2713))
Land Act 1893 (repealed)	57 Vict. No. 1325	3 November 1893
An Act relating to Swamp Lands. (Repealed by Land Act 1901 (1 Edw. VII. No. 1749))
	57 Vict. No. 1326	3 November 1893
An Act to continue in force a certain Rate of Postage.
Water Supply Advances Act 1893	57 Vict. No. 1327	3 November 1893
An Act to apply temporarily out of the moneys raised under the Victorian Government Stock Act 1889 (Note: Victorian Government Stock Act 1889 (53 Vict. No. 1015)) certain sums of money for Irrigation Works and Water Supply purposes.
Treasury Bonds Act 1893	57 Vict. No. 1328	3 November 1893
An Act to authorize the issue of Treasury Bonds.
Public Officers' Retirement Act 1893	57 Vict. No. 1329	3 November 1893
An Act to provide for the further Reduction of the Number of Public Officers.
Working Men's College Loan Act 1893	57 Vict. No. 1330	3 November 1893
An Act to authorize the Trustees of the Working Men's College in the City of Melbourne to borrow Three thousand pounds by way of mortgage on certain Land vested in them.
Margarine Act 1893 (repealed)	57 Vict. No. 1331	3 November 1893
An Act to amend the Law relating to the Manufacture and Sale of Margarine or other mixtures in imitation of Butter. (Repealed by Health Act 1915 (6 Geo. V. No. 2665))
Bakers and Millers Act 1893 (repealed)	57 Vict. No. 1332	3 November 1893
An Act to compel the Sale of Bread by Weight and for other purposes. (Repealed by Bakers and Millers Act 1915 (6 Geo. V. No. 2617))
Factories and Shops Act 1893	57 Vict. No. 1333	3 November 1893
An Act to amend the Factories and Shops Act 1890 (Note: Factories and Shops Act 1890 (54 Vict. No. 1091)) and for other purposes.
Teachers' Salaries Act 1893 (repealed)	57 Vict. No. 1334	3 November 1893
An Act to further amend the Law relating to the Payment of State School Teachers and for other purposes. (Repealed by Public Service Act 1915 (6 Geo. V. No. 2713))
Cape Patterson and Kilcunda Junction Railway Act Further Amendment Act 1893	57 Vict. No. 1335	6 November 1893
An Act to amend and continue an Act intituled "An Act to authorize the construction of the Cape Patterson and Kilcunda Junction Railway and for other purposes." (Note: Cape Patterson and Kilcunda Junction Railway Act 1888 (52 Vict. No. 980))
Chaffey Brothers Limited Removal of Doubts Act 1893	57 Vict. No. 1336	6 November 1893
An Act to remove Doubts as to the powers of Chaffey Brothers Limited to issue certain Shares.
Thistle Act 1893 (repealed)	57 Vict. No. 1337	6 November 1893
An Act to amend the Thistle Act 1890. (Note: Thistle Act 1890 (54 Vict. No. 1145)) (Repealed by Thistle Act 1915 (6 Geo. V. No. 2736))
Horsham Lands Act 1893	57 Vict. No. 1338	6 November 1893
An Act for the purpose of altering the reservation of the Horsham Race-course so far as that reservation makes that Reserve a Public Park.
Wood's Point Municipal Act 1893	57 Vict. No. 1339	6 November 1893
An Act relating to the Wood's Point Municipal District.
Water Supply Loans Application Act 1893 (No. 2)	57 Vict. No. 1340	6 November 1893
An Act to sanction the issue and application of certain sums of money as Loans for Water Supply and Irrigation Works in the Country Districts and for other purposes.
Victorian Government Stock Act 1893	57 Vict. No. 1341	6 November 1893
An Act to authorize the raising of money for certain purposes by increasing the amount of Victorian Government Stock.
Mildura Rating Act 1893 (No. 2)	57 Vict. No. 1342	6 November 1893
An Act to continue and amend the Mildura Rating Act 1893. (Note: Mildura Rating Act 1893 (57 Vict. No. 1304))
	57 Vict. No. 1343	6 November 1893
An Act to extend the operation of Part III. of the Employers and Employés Act 1890. (Note: Employers and Employés Act 1890 (54 Vict. No. 1087)) (Repealed by Employers and Employés Act 1915 (6 Geo. V. No. 2646))
Prahran Loan Act 1893	57 Vict. No. 1344	6 November 1893
An Act to authorize the Council of the City of Prahran to construct certain permanent Works and Undertakings in lieu of certain other permanent Works and Undertakings.
	57 Vict. No. 1345	6 November 1893
An Act to validate the Creation and Appointment of the Campaspe Irrigation and Water Supply Trust and for other purposes.
Metropolitan Fire Brigade Loan Act 1893	57 Vict. No. 1346	6 November 1893
An Act to authorize the Metropolitan Fire Brigades Board to Borrow a further sum of Thirty thousand pounds and for other purposes.
Crown Land Reserves Act 1893 (repealed)	57 Vict. No. 1347	6 November 1893
An Act to revoke in the whole or in part the Permanent Reservation under Orders in Council of certain Crown Lands and to enable such Lands to be used for Agricultural Village and Homestead Settlement. (Repealed by Statute Law Revision Act 1984 (No. 10087))
Statute Law Revision Act 1893	57 Vict. No. 1348	6 November 1893
An Act to correct certain errors in Acts.
South Melbourne and Condah Lessees Act 1893	57 Vict. No. 1349	6 November 1893
An Act to give Relief to certain Lessees of Crown Lands.
Railways Standing Committee Act 1893 (repealed)	57 Vict. No. 1350	6 November 1893
An Act to amend the Law relating to the Railways Standing Committee. (Repealed by Railways Standing Committee Act 1915 (6 Geo. V. No. 2717))
Melbourne and Metropolitan Board of Works Act 1893 (repealed)	57 Vict. No. 1351	6 November 1893
An Act providing for the Temporary Reduction of the Salaries of certain Officers of the Melbourne and Metropolitan Board of Works and for other purposes. (Repealed by Melbourne and Metropolitan Board of Works Act 1915 (6 Geo. V. No. 2696))
Bairnsdale Land Sale Act 1893	57 Vict. No. 1352	6 November 1893
An Act to provide for the Sale of the Bairnsdale Agricultural Show Grounds.
Heidelberg and Eltham Railway Construction Amendment Act 1893	57 Vict. No. 1353	6 November 1893
An Act to amend the Heidelberg and Eltham Railway Construction Act 1893. (Note: Heidelberg and Eltham Railway Construction Act 1893 (57 Vict. No. 1299))
	57 Vict. No. 1354	6 November 1893
An Act to apply a sum out of the Consolidated Revenue to the service of the year ending on the thirtieth day of June One thousand eight hundred and ninety-four and to appropriate the Supplies granted in this Session of Parliament.
Warragul Agricultural Show Grounds Sale Act 1893	57 Vict. No. 1355	6 November 1893
An Act to provide for the Sale of the Warragul Agricultural Show Grounds.
Reconstructed Companies Act 1893	57 Vict. No. 1356	6 November 1893
An Act to facilitate the carrying out the Reconstruction Schemes of Certain Companies and the Compromise Schemes of Certain Societies.

== Sources ==
- "1893 Victorian Historical Acts". AustLII.
