= Civil registration in Australia =

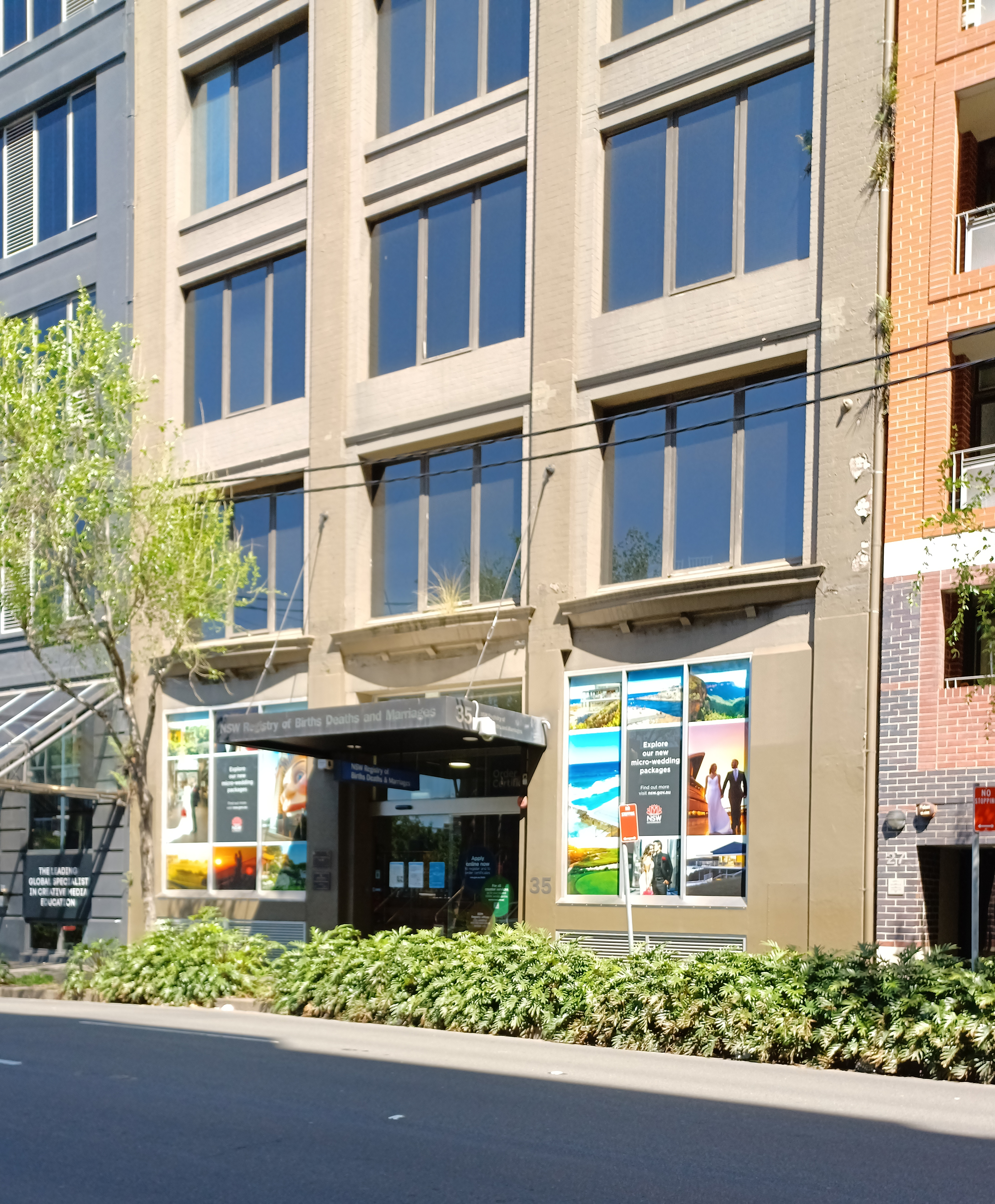
New South Wales Registry of Births Deaths and Marriages

Civil registration in Australia of births, deaths and marriages as well other life events (such as changes of name, registration of relationships, adoption or surrogacy arrangements, changes of sex) is carried out and maintained by each state and territory in Australia, in an office called a Registry of Births, Deaths and Marriages. Registration of these events is compulsory in each jurisdiction, though the procedures and information provided may vary between jurisdictions. Access to information on the register is restricted by period or relationship, and is usually provided at a fee (which may be waived) in the form of certificates. Nowadays, certificates can also be ordered online, and will be posted to the applicant, often subject to some delay.

In Australia, civil registration of births, deaths and marriages that take place in an Australian state or territory, as well as other life events (such as changes of name, registration of relationships, adoption or surrogacy arrangements, changes of sex) are registered in a government office in that state or territory. The registration of these events is compulsory.

== History ==
Compulsory civil registration in a government office commenced in the Australian colonies and territories as follows: Tasmania in 1838, Western Australia in 1841, South Australia in 1842, Victoria in 1853, Queensland in 1856, New South Wales in 1856, Northern Territory in 1870, and Australian Capital Territory in 1911.

Before the commencement of civil registration in each colony, individual churches maintained records of baptisms, marriages and burials performed by them. On the establishment of the government offices, the church records were transferred to the relevant government offices. Because records often involved the churches, it is sometimes difficult to distinguish whether these early records are civil or church records.

== Current legislation ==
Victoria — Births, Deaths and Marriages Registration Act 1996 (No. 43 of 1996 (Vic)).

== Name of government registry offices ==
Today, the names of government registry offices are generally titled "Registry of Births Deaths and Marriages" or similar.

In Victoria, the Registry of Births, Deaths and Marriages maintains records of all births, deaths, marriages, stillbirths, adoptions, legitimations and instruments of paternity which have occurred in Victoria since civil registrations began in 1853. It now also has responsibility for the church records from 1837 to 1853, which are the only source of births and deaths information for that period.

== Registration of births ==
Births in Australia are required to be registered in the state or territory in which the birth takes place, normally within 60 days. No fee is payable for the primary registration.

If a baby is born in a hospital, the hospital will prepare a "Birth Registration Statement" or similar, which is signed by an appropriately licensed and authorised health professional, and which is forwarded to the appropriate state or territory registry office. If the baby is born at home, a statement is required from a registered midwife, doctor or two other witnesses other than the parent(s). Some states require a baby of an unplanned birth to be taken to a hospital within 24 hours. Some states also require still-births to be registered in the same way as regular births.

=== Birth certificates ===
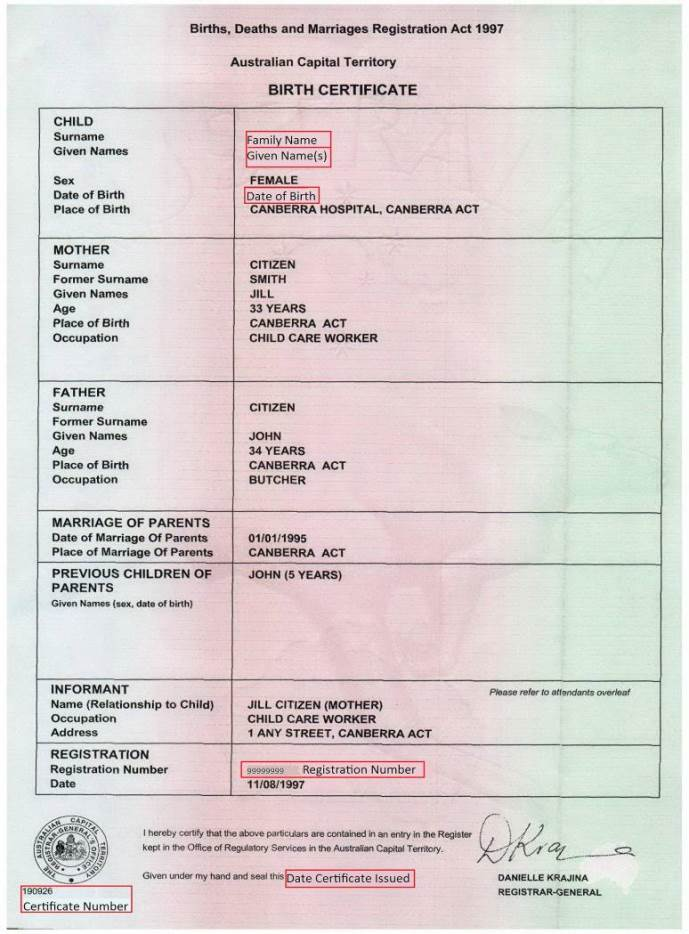
An Australian Capital Territory birth certificate.

To obtain an official birth certificate a separate application must be lodged (which sometimes can be done along with the Birth Registration Statement), generally at a fee. The person(s) named or the parent(s) can apply for a certificate at any time. Generally, there is no restriction on re-applying for a certificate at a later date, so it could be possible to legally hold multiple original copies.

The state or territory issued birth certificate is a secure A4 paper document, generally listing: Full name at birth, sex at birth, parent(s) and occupation(s), older sibling(s), address(es), date and place of birth, name of the registrar, date of registration, date of issue of certificate, a registration number, with the signature of the registrar and seal of the registry printed and/or embossed.

Most states allow for stillbirths to be issued a birth certificate. Some states issue early pregnancy loss certificates (without legal significance if before 20 weeks). Depending on the state or territory, amendments on the certificate are allowed to correct an entry, add ascendant, recognize same-sex relationship, and changing the sex of the holder is possible in all states and territories.

The full birth certificate in Australia is an officially recognized identity document generally in the highest category. The birth certificate assists in establishing citizenship. Shorter and/or commemorative birth certificates are available; however, they are not generally acceptable for identification purposes.

=== Federal government requirements ===
The federal government requires that births be also registered through a "Proof of Birth Declaration" similarly signed as above by a doctor or midwife. The declaration is required to enable appropriate government benefits to be paid, and for the child to be enrolled with Medicare. This proof of birth can be submitted online or at a government office.

Birth certificates in Australia can be verified online by approved agencies through the Attorney-General's Department's Document Verification Service and can be used to validate identity digitally, e.g. online.

Under the Australian government’s 100 point check system, birth certificates are worth 70 points.

== Registration of marriages ==
Marriages in Australia are regulated under federal law. However, the registration of marriages takes place in the registry office in the state or territory in which the marriage took place.

Under federal law, a celebrant issues a certificate at the time of marriage, which is forwarded to the state or territory registry. A similar (sometimes cut-down) document is often given to the couple on the day of the marriage, and is generally handwritten. While legally valid as proof of marriage, it is not generally acceptable as an official document.

Since 2018, Australian federal law has recognised same-sex marriages. These marriages are registrable and documented in the conventional way.

=== Marriage certificates ===
Marriage certificates are issued by the registry in which the marriage is recorded, and need to be applied for separately, for a fee, generally some time after the marriage. States and territories sometimes market commemorative marriage certificates, which generally have no official document status.

State and territory issued certificates are on A4 paper and provide: Date and place of marriage, full names, occupations, addresses, marital status (never validly married, divorced, widow/er), birth date & place, age, father's name, mother's maiden name of each the couple, the celebrant, witness names (generally two), the registrar official of the state or territory authority, and the date of registration. The registrar's signature and seal is printed/embossed on the certificate along with a number, and date of issue of the certificate.

Marriage certificates are not generally used in Australia, but are considered acceptable and secure secondary identity documents. They may be used to prove change of name, and are required to be produced as proof of marital status in a divorce hearing. Some visa categories require a certificate (where a partner is to be associated with a primary applicant); however, there are similar categories of partner visas that do not require production of a marriage certificate.

Marriage certificates can be verified electronically by the Attorney-General's Department's Document Verification Service.

== Registration of deaths ==
Medical practitioners are required to complete and lodge a medical certificate of cause of death. In Victoria, a doctor must notify the registrar within 48 hours of a death if the doctor was responsible for the person's medical care immediately before death or examined the deceased person's body after death. “Reportable” and “reviewable” deaths will normally need to be reported to the coroner or police.

The doctor must also give a copy of the certificate of cause of death to the funeral director, who needs to sign it before a funeral or cremation. Funeral directors will also need some personal information about the deceased, such as birth details, death and burial, family members and home address and occupation. The next of kin (eg., the current spouse, parent or child of the deceased) may need to get a birth and marriage certificate for the information. The funeral director will register the death at the registry office within seven days (though this varies from state to state) of the funeral or cremation.

=== Death certificates ===
The funeral director may, at the same time as the registration of the death at the registry office, apply for an official death certificate on behalf of the next of kin. Family members can apply for a death certificate at any time, but it may take several weeks before a death certificate is produced.

An official death certificate is normally needed for legal and financial purposes, such as accessing pension benefits, claiming life insurance or selling assets. They are also needed if an application for probate or administration is required.

The state registrars are required to advise the Australian Electoral Commission of the death of a person, to enable the AEC to remove the deceased person from the electoral rolls.

== See also ==
- Death certificate
- Marriage certificate
