= List of acts of the Parliament of Victoria from 1972 =

This is a list of acts of the Parliament of Victoria, Australia for the year 1972.

== 1972 ==
Short title, or popular name	Citation	Royal assent
Long title
Adoption of Children (Amendment) Act 1972	No. 8243	28 March 1972
An Act to amend the Adoption of Children Act 1964. (Note: Adoption of Children Act 1964 (No. 7147))
Victorian Arts Centre Act 1972	No. 8249	6 April 1972
An Act to amend the National Art Gallery and Cultural Centre Act 1956 (Note: National Art Gallery and Cultural Centre Act 1956 (No. 6025)) and for other purposes.
Leo Cussen Institute for Continuing Legal Education Act 1972 or the Leo Cussen Institute Act 1972	No. 8254	26 April 1972
An Act to establish a Body Corporate under the Name of the Leo Cussen Institute for Continuing Legal Education and for other purposes.
Mt. Hotham Alpine Resort Act 1972 or the Mount Hotham Alpine Resort Act 1972	No. 8260	9 May 1972
An Act to provide for the Better Administration of the Mt. Hotham Alpine Area.
Government Buildings Advisory Council Act 1972 (repealed)	No. 8265	9 May 1972
An Act to provide for the Establishment of a Government Buildings Advisory Council and for other purposes. (Repealed by Historic Buildings (Amendment) Act 1983 (No. 9890))
Taxation Appeals Act 1972	No. 8274	13 May 1972
An Act to constitute a Victorian Taxation Board of Review, to make Provision concerning Appeals against Decisions Assessments and Determinations relating to Tax and Duty payable under various Acts, to amend the Land Tax Act 1958 (Note: Land Tax Act 1958 (No. 6289)) the Stamps Act 1958 (Note: Stamps Act 1958 (No. 6375)) the Probate Duty Act 1962 (Note: Probate Duty Act 1962 (No. 6890)) the Gift Duty Act 1971 (Note: Gift Duty Act 1971 (No. 8176)) and the Pay-roll Tax Act 1971, (Note: Pay-roll Tax Act 1971 (No. 8154)) and for other purposes.
Consumer Protection Act 1972 or the Consumer Affairs Act 1972 (repealed)	No. 8276	13 May 1972
An Act to continue a Consumer Affairs Council and a Consumer Protection Bureau, to make further Provision with respect to certain dishonest or undesirable Trade Practices, to consolidate and amend certain Enactments relating to the Protection of the Consumer and for other purposes. (Repealed by Fair Trading Act 1999 (No. 16 of 1999))
Motor Car (Amendment) Act 1972	No. 8279	13 May 1972
An Act to amend the Motor Car Act 1958. (Note: Motor Car Act 1958 (No. 6325))
Victoria Institute of Colleges (Affiliated Colleges) Act 1972	No. 8283	13 May 1972
An Act to amend the Victoria Institute of Colleges Act 1965 (Note: Victoria Institute of Colleges Act 1965 (No. 7291)) in relation to the Accounts of Affiliated Colleges, and for other purposes.
Dentists Act 1972	No. 8287	13 May 1972
An Act to re-enact and amend the Law relating to Dentists and the Practice of Dentistry and for other purposes.
Local Government Act 1972	No. 8291	13 May 1972
An Act to amend the Local Government Act 1958, (Note: Local Government Act 1958 (No. 6299)) the County Court Act 1958 (Note: County Court Act 1958 (No. 6230)) and the Local Government (Further Amendment) Act 1971 (Note: Local Government (Further Amendment) Act 1971 (No. 8149)) and for other purposes.
Albert Park Land Act 1972	No. 8295	3 October 1972
An Act to authorize the Committee of Management appointed to manage certain Land called Albert Park and situate in the Municipal Districts of the Cities of South Melbourne and St. Kilda to grant Leases of certain Portions of that Land for the Purposes of Sport or Recreation or Social Activities or Purposes connected therewith.
Summer Time Act 1972	No. 8297	3 October 1972
An Act to promote the greater Use of Daylight in certain Months of the Year and to provide for Matters incidental thereto.
Road Traffic Act 1972 (repealed)	No. 8332	5 December 1972
An Act to amend the Road Traffic Act 1958. (Note: Road Traffic Act 1958 (No. 6359)) (Repealed by Transport Act 1983 (No. 9921))
Melbourne College of Divinity Act 1972	No. 8335	5 December 1972
An Act to amend the Melbourne College of Divinity Act 1910. (Note: Melbourne College of Divinity Act 1910 (1 Geo. V. No. 2275))
Railways (Amendment) Act 1972	No. 8353	13 December 1972
An Act to amend the Railways Act 1958 (Note: Railways Act 1958 (No. 6355)) and for other purposes.
Archaeological and Aboriginal Relics Preservation Act 1972	No. 8273	13 May 1972
An Act to make Provision for the Preservation of Archaeological and Aboriginal Relics.
Attorney-General and Solicitor-General Act 1972	No. 8305	24 October 1972
An Act relating to the Offices of Attorney-General and Solicitor-General.
Constitutional Convention Act 1972	No. 8307	24 October 1972
An Act to make Provision with respect to the Costs and Expenses of the proposed Constitutional Convention and with respect to the Payment of Allowances to the Delegates of the Victorian Parliament to that Convention.
Constitution Act Amendment (Conjoint Elections) Act 1972	No. 8308	1 November 1972
An Act to amend The Constitution Act Amendment Act 1958 (Note: Constitution Act Amendment Act 1958 (No. 6224)) with respect to the Holding and Conduct of Conjoint Elections.
Gas and Fuel Corporation Act 1972 (repealed)	No. 8318	21 November 1972
An Act to increase the Borrowing Powers of the Gas and Fuel Corporation of Victoria, to make Provision with respect to the Duty of Directors and Officers of the said Corporation to amend the Gas and Fuel Corporation Act 1958 (Note: Gas and Fuel Corporation Act 1958 (No. 6260)) and the Gas Franchises Act 1970, (Note: Gas Franchises Act 1970 (No. 8057)) to make Provision with respect to the Dissolution of The Geelong Gas Company (Note: Geelong Gas Company.) and for other purposes. (Repealed by Legislation Reform (Repeals No. 3) Act 2008 (No. 53 of 2008))
Volunteer Civil Defence Workers Compensation Act 1972	No. 8321	21 November 1972
An Act to provide for the Payment of Compensation to Volunteer Civil Defence Workers injured in the Execution of their Duty as such and to the Dependants of those Persons, and for other purposes.
Constitution Act Amendment (Disqualification) Act 1972	No. 8341	5 December 1972
An Act to amend The Constitution Act (Note: Constitution Act 1855 (19 Vict.)) and The Constitution Act Amendment Act 1958 with respect to the Disqualification of Members of the Legislative Council and the Legislative Assembly.
Youth, Sport and Recreation Act 1972	No. 8344	12 December 1972
An Act to establish a Department of Youth, Sport and Recreation and for other purposes.
Motor Car (Learner Drivers' Permits) Act 1972	No. 8345	12 December 1972
An Act to amend the Motor Car Act 1958 to enable the Issue of Learner Drivers' Permits and Motor Cycle Learners' Permits, and for other purposes.
Veterinary Research Institute Act 1972	No. 8346	12 December 1972
An Act to facilitate the Transfer of the Control of the Veterinary Research Institute in the University of Melbourne to the Minister of Agriculture and for other purposes.
Constitution Act Amendment (Appropriations) Act 1972	No. 8348	12 December 1972
An Act to amend Section 66 of The Constitution Act Amendment Act 1958.
Motor Car (Miscellaneous Provisions) Act 1972	No. 8349	12 December 1972
An Act to amend the Motor Car Act 1958.
Victoria Conservation Trust Act 1972 or the Victorian Conservation Trust Act 1972	No. 8350	12 December 1972
An Act to establish a Body Corporate under the Name of the Victoria Conservation Trust and for other purposes.
St. Vincent's Private Hospital (Guarantees) Act 1972	No. 8352	12 December 1972
An Act to amend Section 4 of the St. Vincent's Private Hospital (Guarantees) Act 1969. (Note: St. Vincent's Private Hospital (Guarantees) Act 1969 (No. 7815))
Ministry for the Arts Act 1972	No. 8357	13 December 1972
An Act to establish a Ministry for the Arts and for other purposes.
Criminal Injuries Compensation Act 1972 (repealed)	No. 8359	13 December 1972
An Act to provide for the Compensation of Persons injured by Criminal Acts and of Dependants of Persons killed by such Acts. (Repealed by Criminal Injuries Compensation Act 1983 (No. 9992))
Constitution Act Amendment (Qualifications Joint Select Committee) Act 1972	No. 8360	13 December 1972
An Act to constitute a Joint Select Committee to inquire and report into the Law relating to certain Disqualifications for Membership of the Legislative Council and the Legislative Assembly, to amend The Constitution Act Amendment Act 1958 and for other purposes.
Appropriation Act 1972	No. 8361	19 December 1972
An Act to apply a Sum out of the Consolidated Fund to the Service of the Year ending on the Thirtieth Day of June One Thousand Nine Hundred and Seventy-three and to appropriate the Supplies granted in this and the last preceding Session of Parliament and for other purposes.
Water Supply Works and Services Act 1972 (repealed)	No. 8362	19 December 1972
An Act to authorize Expenditure on Works and Services and other Purposes relating to Irrigation Water Supply Drainage Sewerage Flood Protection and River Improvement, and other purposes. (Repealed by Treasury Legislation (Repeal) Act 2005 (No. 73 of 2005))
Ministry for Conservation Act 1972	No. 8364	19 December 1972
An Act to establish a Ministry for Conservation, to make consequential amendments to certain Acts and for other purposes.
Dental Technicians Act 1972	No. 8366	19 December 1972
An Act to make Provision with respect to the Training Qualifications and Registration of Dental Technicians and for other purposes.
Weights and Measures (Amendment) Act 1972 (repealed)	No. 8368	19 December 1972
An Act to amend the Weights and Measures Act 1958. (Note: Weights and Measures Act 1958 (No. 6414)) (Repealed by Statute Law Revision (Repeals) Act 1999 (No. 3 of 1999))
State College of Victoria Act 1972 (repealed)	No. 8376	19 December 1972
An Act to constitute a Body Corporate under the Style and Title of the State College of Victoria, to confer on the Body Corporate such Powers as are necessary or expedient to advance the Provision of Tertiary Education in Branches of Learning of Importance in the Preparation of Teachers and especially in the Arts, Humanities and Sciences, to amend the Education Act 1958 (Note: Education Act 1958 (No. 6240)) to take account of the foregoing Matters and to provide for the Co-ordination of Tertiary Education in Places in Victoria, and for other purposes. (Repealed by Post-Secondary Education (Amendment) Act 1980 (No. 9424))
Decentralized Industry Incentive Payments Act 1972	No. 8383	19 December 1972
An Act to provide for Incentive Payments to Decentralized Industries and for other purposes.
Boilers and Pressure Vessels (Registration) Act 1972	No.	
Cattle Compensation (Amendment) Act 1972	No.	
Chiropodists (Amendment) Act 1972	No.	
Clean Air (Amendment) Act 1972	No.	
Co-operative Housing Societies Act 1972	No.	
Coal Mines (Pensions Increase) Act 1972	No.	
Coal Mines (Pensions) Act 1972	No.	
Consumer Protection (Amendment) Act 1972	No.	
Country Fire Authority (Amendment) Act 1972	No.	
Country Roads (Amendment) Act 1972	No.	
County Court (Jurisdiction) Act 1972	No.	
Crimes (Amendment) Act 1972	No.	
Crimes (Powers of Arrest) Act 1972	No.	
Crimes Act 1972	No.	
Crown Grants (Removal of Conditions) Act 1972	No.	
Crown Reservations (Revocation and Excision) Act 1972	No.	
Disposal of Uncollected Goods (Amendment) Act 1972	No.	
Dookie Agricultural College Land Act 1972	No.	
Education (Amendment) Act 1972	No.	
Educational Grants Act 1972	No.	
Environment Protection (Amendment) Act 1972	No.	
Evidence Act 1972	No.	
Farm Produce Merchants and Commission Agents (Amendment) Act 1972	No.	
Films (Amendment) Act 1972	No.	
Firearms (Amendment) Act 1972	No.	
Footscray (Bailey Reserve) Land Act 1972	No.	
Game Act 1972	No.	
Geelong Lands Exchange Act 1972	No.	
Geelong Waterworks and Sewerage (Amendment) Act 1972	No.	
Health (Amendment) Act 1972	No.	
Housing (Amendment) Act 1972	No.	
Housing Ministry Act 1972	No.	
Justices Act 1972	No.	
Labour and Industry (Amendment) Act 1972	No.	
Land (Crown Bailiffs) Act 1972	No.	
Land (Greyhound Racing) Act 1972	No.	
Land (Jetties and Marinas) Act 1972	No.	
Land (Residence Areas) Act 1972	No.	
Land Conservation (Vehicle Control) Act 1972	No.	
Land Tax Act 1972	No.	
Legal Profession Practice (Amendment) Act 1972	No.	
Lifts and Cranes (Amendment) Act 1972	No.	
Limitation of Actions (Personal Injuries) Act 1972	No.	
Liquor Control (Amendment) Act 1972	No.	
Local Government (Leases) Act 1972	No.	
Marine Act 1972	No.	
Melbourne and Metropolitan Board of Works (Reconstitution) Act 1972	No.	
Melbourne Land (Royal Melbourne Institute of Technology) Act 1972	No.	
Mental Health (Admissions) Act 1972	No.	
Metric Conversion (Agricultural Chemicals) Act 1972	No.	
Mildura Irrigation and Water Trusts (Amendment) Act 1972	No.	
Milk and Dairy Supervision (Amendment) Act 1972	No.	
Mines (Amendment) Act 1972	No.	
Montrose Land Act 1972	No.	
National Gallery of Victoria Act 1972	No.	
Navigable Waters (Oil Pollution) (Amendment) Act 1972	No.	
Nurses (Amendment) Act 1972	No.	
Opticians Registration (Amendment) Act 1972	No.	
Parliamentary Committees (Take-over Offers) Act 1972	No.	
Pesticides (Amendment) Act 1972	No.	
Poisons (Amendment) Act 1972	No.	
Police Offences Act 1972	No.	
Public Service (Amendment) Act 1972	No.	
Public Service (Appeals) Act 1972	No.	
Public Works and Services Act 1972	No.	
Racing (Totalizator Commissions) Act 1972	No.	
Railway Works and Services Act 1972	No.	
Registration of Births Deaths and Marriages (Amendment) Act 1972	No.	
Revocation and Excision of Crown Reservations Act 1972	No.	
Ringwood (Recreation Reserve) Land Act 1972	No.	
River Improvement (Amendment) Act 1972	No.	
Road Traffic (Amendment) Act 1972	No.	
Sandringham (Beach Oval) Land Act 1972	No.	
Seamen's (Amendment) Act 1972	No.	
Second-hand Dealers (Charitable Collectors) Act 1972	No.	
Select Committee (Ansett Transport Industries) Act 1972	No.	
Sewerage Districts (Amendment) Act 1972	No.	
Soldier Settlement (Amendment) Act 1972	No.	
Sports Promotion Act 1972	No.	
Stamps (Bookmakers' Statements) Act 1972	No.	
State Electricity Commission (Amendment) Act 1972	No.	
State Electricity Commission (Borrowing Powers) Act 1972	No.	
State Electricity Commission (Dartmouth Hydro-Electric Power Station) Act 1972	No.	
State Electricity Commission (Yallourn W Power Station) Act 1972	No.	
State Forests Works and Services Act 1972	No.	
State Rivers and Water Supply Commission (Special Projects) Act 1972	No.	
Superannuation Act 1972	No.	
Supply (July to September) Act 1972	No.	
Supply (October to December) Act 1972	No.	
Supply (Supplementary Estimates) Act 1972	No.	
Supreme Court (Civil Appeals) Act 1972	No.	
Supreme Court (Judges) Act 1972	No.	
Surrender of Land Act 1972	No.	
Tattersall Consultations (Amendment) Act 1972	No.	
Town and Country Planning (Amendment) Act 1972	No.	
Trustee Companies (National Trustees) Act 1972	No.	
Trustee Companies (Sandhurst and Northern District Trustees Executors and Agency Company Limited) Act 1972	No.	
Vermin and Noxious Weeds (Allowances) Act 1972	No.	
Western Port (Steel Works Rating) Act 1972	No.	
Wheat Marketing (Over-quota Wheat) Act 1972	No.	
Workers Compensation Act 1972	No.	
Wrongs Act 1972	No.	
Yarraville (Recreation Ground) Lands (Amendment) Act 1972	No.	
Youth, Sport and Recreation Act 1972	No.	

== Sources ==
- "1972 Victorian Historical Acts". AustLII.
