= List of acts of the Parliament of Victoria from 1953 =

This is a list of acts of the Parliament of Victoria, Australia for the year 1953.

== 1953 ==
| Short title, or popular name | Citation | Royal assent |
Long title
| Adoption of Children (Amendment) Act 1953 | No. 5666 | 14 April 1953 |
An Act to amend the Adoption of Children Acts.
| Geelong Gas Company's Act 1953 (repealed) | No. 5679 | 21 April 1953 |
An Act to further amend The Geelong Gas Company's Act 1858. (Note: Geelong Gas Company's Act 1858 (21 Vict. No. 57)) (Repealed by Gas and Fuel Corporation Act 1972 (No. 8318)
| | No. 5682 | 21 April 1953 |
An Act to apply out of the Consolidated Revenue the sum of Twenty million two hundred and forty thousand three hundred and twelve pounds to the service of the year One thousand nine hundred and fifty-three and One thousand nine hundred and fifty-four.
| | No. 5687 | 30 September 1953 |
An Act to apply out of the Consolidated Revenue the sum of Thirteen million five hundred and forty-six thousand six hundred and ninety-one pounds to the service of the year One thousand nine hundred and fifty-three and One thousand nine hundred and fifty-four.
| | No. 5688 | 6 October 1953 |
An Act to apply out of the Consolidated Revenue the sum of One million three hundred and twenty-nine thousand three hundred and forty-five pounds to the service of the year One thousand nine hundred and fifty-two and One thousand nine hundred and fifty-three.
| Superannuation (Newport "A" Employés) Act 1953 or the Superannuation (Newport "A" Employees) Act 1953 | No. 5690 | 6 October 1953 |
An Act relating to Superannuation Contributions and Benefits in respect of certain Persons employed at Newport "A " Power Station, and for other purposes.
| Bendigo Gas Company's Act 1953 | No. 5692 | 6 October 1953 |
An Act relating to the Capital Shares and Borrowing Powers of the Bendigo Gas Company.
| Opticians Registration (Fees) Act 1953 (repealed) | No. 5700 | 4 November 1953 |
An Act to amend Sections Fourteen and Twenty-two the Opticians Registration Act 1935. (Note: Opticians Registration Act 1935 (No. 4357)) (Repealed by Opticians Registration Act 1958 (No. 6329))
| Tattersall Consultations Act 1953 | No. 5705 | 17 November 1953 |
An Act to provide for the Promotion in Victoria and the Conduct of Sweepstakes known as Tattersall Sweep Consultation Care of George Adams, and for other purposes.
| Architects (Amendment) Act 1953 | No. 5707 | 17 November 1953 |
An Act to amend the Architects Act 1928. (Note: Architects Act 1928 (19 Geo. V. No. 3638))
| Essendon Land (Amendment) Act 1953 (repealed) | No. 5709 | 17 November 1953 |
An Act to amend the Essendon Land Act 1934 (Note: Essendon Land Act 1934 (No. 4230)) and to make further Provision with respect to Parts of the Land therein referred to, and for other purposes. (Repealed by Statute Law Revision Act 1984 (No. 10087))
| Castlemaine Gas Company's Act 1953 | No. 5716 | 25 November 1953 |
An Act to increase the Borrowing Powers of The Castlemaine Gas Company.
| | No. 5721 | 25 November 1953 |
An Act to apply out of the Consolidated Revenue the sum of Seven million six hundred and sixty-four thousand five hundred and seventy pounds to the service of the year One thousand nine hundred and fifty-three and One thousand nine hundred and fifty-four.
| Oldham Trusts Act 1953 | No. 5724 | 1 December 1953 |
An Act relating to certain Policies of Insurance on the Lives of Trevor Donald Oldham and Kathleen MacLeod Oldham.
| Ballaarat Gas Company's Act 1953 | No. 5735 | 8 December 1953 |
An Act to further amend The Ballaarat Gas Company's Act 1857 (Note: Ballaarat Gas Company's Act 1857 (21 Vict. No. 27)) and for purposes in relation thereto.
| Statute Law Revision Committee (Amendment) Act 1953 | No. 5737 | 15 December 1953 |
An Act to amend Section Five of the Statute Law Revision Committee Act 1948. (Note: Statute Law Revision Committee Act 1948 (No. 5285))
| Statute Law Revision Act 1953 | No. 5753 | 22 December 1953 |
An Act to revise the Statute Law and for other purposes.
| Statutes Amendment Act 1953 (repealed) | No. 5757 | 22 December 1953 |
An Act to amend the Administration and Probate Acts the County Court Acts the Employers and Employés Acts the Fences Act 1928 (Note: Fences Act 1928 (19 Geo. V. No. 3679)) the Imprisonment of Fraudulent Debtors Acts the Instruments Acts the Melbourne and Metropolitan Tramways Acts the Property Law Acts the Transfer of Land Acts the Wrongs Acts and the Companies Acts and for other purposes relating to the said Acts. (Repealed by Statute Law Revision Act 1995 (No. 11 of 1995))
| Public Works Loan Application Act 1953 (repealed) | No. 5763 | 22 December 1953 |
An Act to sanction the Issue and Application of Loan Money for Public Works and other Purposes. (Repealed by Treasury Legislation (Repeal) Act 2005 (No. 73 of 2005))
| | No. 5772 | 23 December 1953 |
An Act to apply a sum out of the Consolidated Revenue to the service of the year ending on the thirtieth day of June One thousand nine hundred and fifty-four and to appropriate the Supplies granted in this Session of Parliament.
| Barley Marketing (Amendment) Act 1953 | No. | |
| Barley Marketing Act 1953 | No. | |
| Benefit Associations Act 1953 | No. | |
| Bookmakers Act 1953 | No. | |
| Building Operations and Building Materials Control (Extension) Act 1953 | No. | |
| Building Societies Act 1953 | No. | |
| Cancer Institute (Loan Moneys) Act 1953 | No. | |
| Co-operation Act 1953 | No. | |
| Co-operative Housing Societies (Amendment) Act 1953 | No. | |
| Coal Mine Wokers Pensions (Amendment) Act 1953 | No. | |
| Corio to Newport Pipeline Act 1953 | No. | |
| Coroners Act 1953 | No. | |
| Country Fire Authority (Finance) Act 1953 | No. | |
| Country Sewerage Loan Application Act 1953 | No. | |
| Crown Hotel, Traralgon, Licence Act 1953 | No. | |
| Electoral Districts Act 1953 | No. | |
| Entertainments Tax (Amendment) Act 1953 | No. | |
| Entertainments Tax Act 1953 | No. | |
| Evidence (Amendment) Act 1953 | No. | |
| Factories and Shops (Industrial Appeals Court) Act 1953 | No. | |
| Factories and Shops (Long Service Leave) Act 1953 | No. | |
| Factories and Shops (Wages Boards) Act 1953 | No. | |
| Footscray and Maribyrnong Tramway Construction Act 1953 | No. | |
| Free Presbyterian Church Property Act 1953 | No. | |
| Gas and Fuel Corporation (Financial) Act 1953 | No. | |
| Gas and Fuel Corporation (Mordialloc Undertaking) Act 1953 | No. | |
| Gas and Fuel Corporation (Traralgon Undertaking) Act 1953 | No. | |
| Goods (Sale of Sheep Skins) Act 1953 | No. | |
| Goods (Textile Products) Act 1953 | No. | |
| Grain Elevators (Damages) Act 1953 | No. | |
| Health (Plumbers and Gas-fitters) Act 1953 | No. | |
| Health (Proprietary Medicines) Act 1953 | No. | |
| Hotham Heights Land Act 1953 | No. | |
| Housing Act 1953 | No. | |
| Junior Legacy, Melbourne (Dureau Memorial) Act 1953 | No. | |
| Juries (Fees) Act 1953 | No. | |
| Labour and Industry Act 1953 | No. | |
| Land Settlement Act | No. | |
| Land Surveyors Act 1953 | No. | |
| Land Tax (Exemptions and Rates) Act 1953 | No. | |
| Landlord and Tenant Act 1953 | No. | |
| Latrobe Valley Water and Sewerage Act 1953 | No. | |
| Licensing (Amendment) Act 1953 | No. | |
| Licensing (Chairman of Courts) Act 1953 | No. | |
| Local Government (Amendment) Act 1953 | No. | |
| Local Government (Imported Houses) Act 1953 | No. | |
| Maintenance (Amendment) Act 1953 | No. | |
| Marketing (Egg and Egg Pulp) Act 1953 | No. | |
| Medical (Registration) Act 1953 | No. | |
| Melbourne and Metropolitan Board of Works (Borrowing Powers) Act 1953 | No. | |
| Melbourne and Metropolitan Board of Works (Reconstitution) Act 1953 | No. | |
| Melbourne and Metropolitan Tramways Act 1953 | No. | |
| Melbourne Harbour Trust (Amendment) Act 1953 | No. | |
| Melbourne Harbour Trust (Tolls) Act 1953 | No. | |
| Motor Car (Fees) Act 1953 | No. | |
| Motor Car (Visiting Cars and Drivers) Act 1953 | No. | |
| Nurses and Midwives Act 1953 | No. | |
| Parking of Vehicles Act 1953 | No. | |
| Parliamentary Elections (State Servants) Act 1953 | No. | |
| Patriotic Funds (Amendment) Act 1953 | No. | |
| Poisons (Heroin) Act 1953 | No. | |
| Police Offences (Cranbourne and Werribee Race-courses) Act 1953 | No. | |
| Police Offences (Trotting Races) Act 1953 | No. | |
| Prices Regulation (Continuation) Act 1953 | No. | |
| Public Account (Amendment) Act 1953 | No. | |
| Public and Bank Holidays Act 1953 | No. | |
| Public Trustee (Common Fund) Act 1953 | No. | |
| Railway Loan Application Act 1953 | No. | |
| Railways (Mt. Buffalo Chalet) Act 1953 | No. | |
| Revenue Deficit Funding Act 1953 | No. | |
| Revocation and Excision of Crown Reservations Act 1953 | No. | |
| Select Committee (Potato Marketing) Act 1953 | No. | |
| Sewerage Districts (Amendment) Act 1953 | No. | |
| State Forests Loan Application Act 1953 | No. | |
| Superannuation Police and State Pensions (Extension) Act 1953 | No. | |
| Superannuation Police and State Pensions Act 1953 | No. | |
| Supreme Court (Judges) Act 1953 | No. | |
| Swine Compensation Act 1953 | No. | |
| Transport (Amendment) Act 1953 | No. | |
| Transport Regulation (Amendment) Act 1953 | No. | |
| Trustee (Amendment) Act 1953 | No. | |
| Trustee Act 1953 | No. | |
| Trustee Companies (Commission) Act 1953 | No. | |
| Water (Amendment) Act 1953 | No. | |
| Water Supply Loan Application Act 1953 | No. | |
| Wheat Marketing Act 1953 | No. | |
| Workers Compensation (Amendment) Act 1953 | No. | |
| Workers Compensation Act 1953 | No. | |
| Wrongs (Damage by Aircraft) Act 1953 | No. | |

== Sources ==
- "1953 Victorian Historical Acts". AustLII.
