= List of acts of the Parliament of Victoria from 1858 =

This is a list of acts of the Parliament of Victoria, Australia for the year 1858.

== 1858 ==
The second session of the first parliament of Victoria.

Short title, or popular name	Citation	Royal assent
Long title
	21 Vict. No. 45	27 January 1858
An Act to assimilate and simplify the Oaths of Qualification for Office. (Repealed by Public Service Act 1890 (54 Vict. No. 1133))
	21 Vict. No. 46	10 March 1858
An Act to appropriate the Consolidated Revenue towards the service of the year One thousand eight hundred and fifty-eight and for other purposes.
	21 Vict. No. 47	10 March 1858
An Act for an Assessment on Stock. (Repealed by 22 Vict. No. 79)
	21 Vict. No. 48	10 March 1858
An Act to give further Remedies to Creditors against Debtors removing from any other of the Australasian Colonies to the Colony of Victoria. (Repealed by Common Law Procedure Statute 1865 (28 Vict. No. 274))
	21 Vict. No. 49	4 June 1858 (Note: This act was reserved for approval by Her Majesty.)
An Act for the enforcement of Claims against the Crown. (Repealed by Crown Remedies and Liability Statute 1865 (28 Vict. No. 241))
	21 Vict. No. 50	4 June 1858
An Act to amend an Act intituled "An Act to authorise the construction of a Main Trunk Line of Railway from Melbourne to the River Murray and of a Main Trunk Line of Railway from Geelong to Ballarat." (Note: 21 Vict. No. 35) (Repealed by Public Works Statute 1865 (29 Vict. No. 289))
Union Bank of Australia Act 1858	21 Vict. No. 51	4 June 1858
An Act more effectually to facilitate proceedings in the Colony of Victoria by and against a certain Banking Company called the "Union Bank of Australia" and for other purposes therein mentioned.
	21 Vict. No. 52	4 June 1858
An Act to amend an Act intituled "An Act for making and improving Roads in the Colony of Victoria." (Note: Roads Act 1853 (16 Vict. No. 40)) (Repealed by Public Works Statute 1865 (29 Vict. No. 289))
	21 Vict. No. 53	4 June 1858
An Act to amend the Laws relating to particular Friendly Societies. (Repealed by Friendly Societies Statute 1865 (28 Vict. No. 254))
	21 Vict. No. 54	4 June 1858
An Act to restrict the Boundaries of the Town of Geelong and to make further provision for defining the Wards thereof.
	21 Vict. No. 55	4 June 1858
An Act for preventing the careless use of Fire. (Repealed by Police Offences Statute 1865 (28 Vict. No. 265))
Mining Association Act 1858 (repealed)	21 Vict. No. 56	4 June 1858
An Act to facilitate the Formation of Mining Associations and to amend and extend the provisions of an Act passed in the eighteenth year of the reign of Her present Majesty intituled "An Act for the better Regulation of Mining Companies" (Note: 18 Vict. No. 42) and to render certain Preferable Liens and Mortgages of Personalty by Miners and Mining Companies valid without delivery and for other purposes. (Repealed by Companies Statute 1864 (27 Vict. No. 190))
Geelong Gas Company's Act 1858 (repealed)	21 Vict. No. 57	4 June 1858
An Act to incorporate a Company to be called "The Geelong Gas Company" and for other purposes. (Repealed by Gas and Fuel Corporation Act 1972 (No. 8318)
	21 Vict. No. 58	4 June 1858
An Act to amend an Act to establish a Board of Land and Works. (Repealed by 25 Vict. No. 131)
Melbourne Sewerage and Water Amendment Act 1858 (repealed)	21 Vict. No. 59	4 June 1858
An Act to amend an Act intituled "An Act to establish a Board of Commissioners for the better Sewerage and Drainage of the City of Melbourne and for supplying Water thereto and to the Suburbs thereof." (Note: Melbourne Sewerage and Water Act 1853 (16 Vict. No. 39)) (Repealed by Public Works Statute 1865 (29 Vict. No. 289))
	21 Vict. No. 60	4 June 1858
An Act to enable the Postmaster General to issue Money Orders in the Colony of Victoria. (Repealed by Post Office Statute 1864 (27 Vict. No. 226))

The third session of the first parliament of Victoria.

Short title, or popular name	Citation	Royal assent
Long title
	21 Vict. No. 61	17 December 1858
An Act to amend the Law relating to the Administration of the Estate of Deceased Persons. (Repealed by Real Property Statute 1864 (27 Vict. No. 213))
	21 Vict. No. 62	17 December 1858
An Act to amend the Mining Association Act 1858. (Note: Mining Association Act 1858 (21 Vict. No. 56)) (Repealed by Companies Statute 1864 (27 Vict. No. 190))
	21 Vict. No. 63	17 December 1858
An Act for granting a Duty on Spirits distilled in Victoria. (Repealed by 25 Vict. No. 147)
	21 Vict. No. 64	17 December 1858
An Act to alter the Electoral Districts of Victoria and to increase the number of Members of the Legislative Assembly thereof. (Repealed by Electoral Act Amendment Act 1876 (40 Vict. No. 548))
	21 Vict. No. 65	17 December 1858
An Act to remove doubts as to the power of the Governor under the forty-eighth section of "The Constitution Act." (Note: Constitution Act 1855 (19 Vict.)) (Repealed by Constitution Act Amendment Act 1890 (54 Vict. No. 1075))

== Sources ==
- "1858 Victorian Historical Acts". AustLII.
