= List of acts of the Parliament of Victoria from 1925 =

This is a list of acts of the Parliament of Victoria, Australia for the year 1925.

== 1925 ==
Short title, or popular name	Citation	Royal assent
Long title
	16 Geo. V. No. 3391	9 July 1925
An Act to apply out of the Consolidated Revenue the sum of Two million seven hundred and forty-six thousand four hundred and forty-seven pounds to the service of the year One thousand nine hundred and twenty-five and One thousand nine hundred and twenty-six.
	16 Geo. V. No. 3392	27 July 1925
An Act to apply out of the Consolidated Revenue the sum of Six hundred and forty-four thousand two hundred and nineteen pounds to the service of the year One thousand nine hundred and twenty-four and One thousand nine hundred and twenty-five.
Great Ocean Road Lands Act 1925 (repealed)	16 Geo. V. No. 3393	31 August 1925
An Act to amend the Great Ocean Road Lands Acts. (Repealed by Statute Law Revision Act 1984 (No. 10087))
	16 Geo. V. No. 3394	2 September 1925
An Act to apply out of the Consolidated Revenue the sum of One million three hundred and thirty-seven thousand nine hundred and ten pounds to the service of the year One thousand nine hundred and twenty-five and One thousand nine hundred and twenty-six.
Act No. 391 Amendment Act 1925	16 Geo. V. No. 3396	21 September 1925
An Act to provide for the Amendment or Variation of Allowances under the Act of the Parliament of Victoria providing for the Abolition of State Aid to Religion and Numbered 391 (Note: State Aid to Religion Abolition Act 1871 (34 Vict. No. 391)) and for other purposes.
	16 Geo. V. No. 3399	1 October 1925
An Act to apply out of the Consolidated Revenue the sum of One million four hundred and sixty-one thousand five hundred and sixty pounds to the service of the year One thousand nine hundred and twenty-five and One thousand nine hundred and twenty-six.
	16 Geo. V. No. 3405	2 November 1925
An Act to apply out of the Consolidated Revenue the sum of One million three hundred and fourteen thousand nine hundred and four pounds to the service of the year One thousand nine hundred and twenty-five and One thousand nine hundred and twenty-six.
Anzac Day Act 1925 (repealed)	16 Geo. V. No. 3407	2 November 1925
An Act to constitute Anzac Day a Public and Bank Holiday and for other purposes. (Repealed by Anzac Day Act 1928 (19 Geo. V. No. 3635))
	16 Geo. V. No. 3410	2 December 1925
An Act to apply out of the Consolidated Revenue the sum of One million three hundred and eighty-six thousand nine hundred and forty-one pounds to the service of the year One thousand nine hundred and twenty-five and One thousand nine hundred and twenty-six.
University Act 1925	16 Geo. V. No. 3411	7 December 1925
An Act to amend Section Twenty-one of the University Act 1923. (Note: University Act 1923 (14 Geo. V. No. 3285))
Geelong (Harbor Trust) Land Act 1925 (repealed)	16 Geo. V. No. 3412	7 December 1925
An Act to provide for the Permanent Reservation of certain Land in the Parish of Corio County of Grant and for other purposes. (Repealed by Statute Law Revision Act 1984 (No. 10087))
Dried Fruits Act 1925 (repealed)	16 Geo. V. No. 3418	24 December 1925
An Act to amend the Dried Fruits Act 1924 (Note: Dried Fruits Act 1924 (15 Geo. V. No. 3380)) and for other purposes. (Repealed by Dried Fruits Act 1928 (19 Geo. V. No. 3670))
Closer Settlement Act 1925	16 Geo. V. No. 3422	24 December 1925
An Act to amend the Closer Settlement Acts and the Discharged Soldiers Settlement Acts and for other purposes.
Warburton (La La Extension) to Big Pat's Creek Railway Construction Act 1925	16 Geo. V. No. 3426	31 December 1925
An Act to authorize the Construction by the State of a Line of Railway from Warburton (La La Extension) to Big Pat's Creek.
Fire Brigades Act 1925 (repealed)	16 Geo. V. No. 3430	31 December 1925
An Act to authorize the Metropolitan Fire Brigades Board to borrow a further sum not exceeding Fifty thousand pounds. (Repealed by Statute Law Revision Act 1984 (No. 10087))
Geelong Gas Company's Act 1925 (repealed)	16 Geo. V. No. 3440	31 December 1925
An Act to further amend The Geelong Gas Company's Act 1858. (Note: Geelong Gas Company's Act 1858 (21 Vict. No. 57)) (Repealed by Gas and Fuel Corporation Act 1972 (No. 8318)
Conveyancing Act 1925	16 Geo. V. No.	
Country Roads Act 1925	16 Geo. V. No.	
Echuca Land Act 1925	16 Geo. V. No.	
Fisheries Act 1925	16 Geo. V. No.	
Game Act 1925	16 Geo. V. No.	
Horse Breeding Act 1925	16 Geo. V. No.	
Income Tax Act 1925	16 Geo. V. No.	
Judgments (Reciprocity) Act 1925	16 Geo. V. No.	
Land Tax Act 1925	16 Geo. V. No.	
Maintenance Orders (Facilities for Enforcement) Act 1925	16 Geo. V. No.	
Malvern Land Act 1925	16 Geo. V. No.	
Melbourne and Metropolitan Board of Works (Finances) Act 1925	16 Geo. V. No.	
Melbourne and Metropolitan Tramways Act 1925	16 Geo. V. No.	
Melbourne Harbor Trust Act 1925	16 Geo. V. No.	
Metropolitan Town Planning Commission Act 1925	16 Geo. V. No.	
Motor Omnibus Act 1925	16 Geo. V. No.	
Municipal Endowment Act 1925	16 Geo. V. No.	
Municipal Sinking Funds Act 1925	16 Geo. V. No.	
Poisons Act 1925	16 Geo. V. No.	
Public Works Loan Application Act 1925	16 Geo. V. No.	
Railway Loan Application Act 1925	16 Geo. V. No.	
Railways Act 1925	16 Geo. V. No.	
Sewerage Districts Act 1925	16 Geo. V. No.	
State Electricity Commission (Funds and Accounts) Act 1925	16 Geo. V. No.	
Street Trading Act 1925	16 Geo. V. No.	
Superannuation Act 1925	16 Geo. V. No.	
Tambo Land Act 1935	16 Geo. V. No.	
Teachers Act 1925	16 Geo. V. No.	
Victorian Loan (Country Sewerage) Act 1925	16 Geo. V. No.	
Victorian Loan (Electricity Supply) and Application Act 1925	16 Geo. V. No.	
Victorian Loan (Public Works) Act 1924 Amendment Act 1925	16 Geo. V. No.	
Victorian Loan Act 1925	16 Geo. V. No.	
Victorian Wheatgrowers Corporation Limited (Government Guarantee) Act 1925	16 Geo. V. No.	
Water Supply Loans Application Act 1925	16 Geo. V. No.	

== Sources ==
- "1925 Victorian Historical Acts". AustLII.
