= List of acts of the Parliament of Victoria from 1967 =

This is a list of acts of the Parliament of Victoria, Australia for the year 1967.

== 1967 ==
Short title, or popular name	Citation	Royal assent
Long title
Zoological Gardens Act 1967 or the Zoological Parks and Gardens Act 1967	No. 7518	15 March 1967
An Act relating to the Administration and Control of the Zoological Gardens and for Purposes connected therewith.
Richmond (South-Eastern Freeway) Lands Act 1967	No. 7519	15 March 1967
An Act relating to certain Lands in the Cities of Richmond and Prahran.
Geelong Gas Company's Act 1967 (repealed)	No. 7520	15 March 1967
An Act to amend The Geelong Gas Company's Act 1858, (Note: Geelong Gas Company's Act 1858 (21 Vict. No. 57)) and for other purposes. (Repealed by Gas and Fuel Corporation Act 1972 (No. 8318)
Warragul (Public Park) Lands Act 1967	No. 7526	15 March 1967
An Act relating to certain Lands at Warragul permanently reserved as a Site for a Public Park and Garden, and to authorize the Granting of Leases of a certain Part thereof and for other purposes.
Weights and Measures (Amendment) Act 1967 (repealed)	No. 7531	17 March 1967
An Act to amend the Weights and Measures Act 1958 (Note: Weights and Measures Act 1958 (No. 6414)) to extend the Functions of the Central Administration, to amend the Provisions relating to the Baking and the Sale of Bread, and for other purposes. (Repealed by Statute Law Revision (Repeals) Act 1999 (No. 3 of 1999))
Constitution Act Amendment (Electoral) Act 1967	No. 7532	17 March 1967
An Act to amend The Constitution Act Amendment Act 1958 (Note: Constitution Act Amendment Act 1958 (No. 6224)) with respect to the Conduct of Elections.
Pipelines (Submerged Lands) Act 1967 (repealed)	No. 7537	17 March 1967
An Act to regulate the Construction and Operation of Pipelines in under and over the Sea-bed and Subsoil adjacent to the Coasts of the State of Victoria and for other purposes. (Repealed by Petroleum (Submerged Lands) Act 1967 (No. 7591)
Petroleum (Barracouta and Marlin Fields Agreement) Act 1967 (repealed)	No. 7540	17 March 1967
An Act to ratify validate approve and otherwise give Effect to an Agreement between the Premier for and on behalf of the State of Victoria and Haematite Explorations Proprietary Limited and Esso Exploration and Production Australia Inc. with respect to the Recovery of the Petroleum Resources from certain Submerged Lands adjacent to the State and for other purposes. (Repealed by Petroleum (Submerged Lands) Act 1967 (No. 7591)
Pipelines Act 1967 (repealed)	No. 7541	17 March 1967
An Act to enable Ownership and Use and the Construction Maintenance and Operation of Pipelines in Victoria, and for other purposes. (Repealed by Pipelines Act 2005 (No. 61 of 2005))
Stamps (Amendment) Act 1967	No. 7543	17 March 1967
An Act to amend the Interpretation of "Credit Arrangement" in Sub-section (1) of Section 131AA of the Stamps Act 1958. (Note: Stamps Act 1958 (Stamps Act 1958))
Melbourne University (Amendment) Act 1967	No. 7545	17 March 1967
An Act to amend the Melbourne University Act 1958. (Note: University Act 1958 (No. 6405))
Water (Amendment) Act 1967 (repealed)	No. 7549	17 March 1967
An Act to amend the Water Act 1958, (Note: Water Act 1958 (No. 6413)) and for other purposes. (Repealed by Statute Law Revision (Repeals) Act 1999 (No. 3 of 1999))
Strata Titles Act 1967	No. 7551	17 March 1967
An Act to facilitate the Subdivision of Land in Strata, the Issue of Titles to Units shown on Plans of Strata Subdivision, and the Administration of Land Subdivided in Strata, and for other purposes.
Tullamarine Freeway Lands Act 1967	No. 7553	17 March 1967
An Act relating to Certain Lands in the Parish of Jika Jika and the Parish of Doutta Galla.
	No. 7556	23 May 1967
An Act to apply out of the Consolidated Revenue the sum of One hundred million nine hundred and ninety-two thousand nine hundred dollars to the service of the year One thousand nine hundred and sixty-seven and One thousand nine hundred and sixty-eight.
	No. 7557	23 May 1967
An Act to apply out of the Consolidated Revenue the sum of Three million seven hundred and fifty-seven thousand six hundred and eighty-four dollars to the service of the year One thousand nine hundred and sixty-six and One thousand nine hundred and sixty-seven.
	No. 7559	26 September 1967
An Act to apply out of the Consolidated Revenue the sum of One hundred and eight million six hundred and thirty-two thousand three hundred and eighty dollars to the service of the year One thousand nine hundred and sixty-seven and One thousand nine hundred and sixty-eight.
	No. 7560	17 October 1967
An Act to apply out of the Consolidated Revenue the sum of Three million five hundred and seventy-two thousand nine hundred and ten dollars to the Service of the year One thousand nine hundred and sixty-six and One thousand nine hundred and sixty-seven.
Council of Law Reporting in Victoria Act 1967	No. 7569	8 November 1967
An Act to provide for the Incorporation of the Council of Law Reporting in Victoria.
Railway Lands Act 1967 (repealed)	No. 7571	8 November 1967
An Act to make Provision with respect to the Sale of certain Railway Lands, and for other purposes. (Repealed by Transport Act 1983 (No. 9921))
Aboriginal Affairs Act 1967 (repealed)	No. 7574	8 November 1967
An Act to establish a Ministry of Aboriginal Affairs and for other purposes. (Repealed by Aboriginal Affairs (Transfer of Functions) Act 1974 (No. 8606)
Stamps Act 1967	No. 7585	21 November 1967
An Act relating to Receipt Duty, to amend the Stamps Act 1958 and for other purposes.
Water (Further Amendment) Act 1967	No. 7590	28 November 1967
An Act to amend the Water Act 1958.
Petroleum (Submerged Lands) Act 1967	No. 7591	28 November 1967
An Act to make Provision with respect to the Exploration for, and the Exploitation of, the Petroleum Resources, and certain other Resources of certain Submerged Lands adjacent to the Coasts of the State, to amend the Petroleum Act 1958 (Note: Petroleum Act 1958 (No. 6334)) and the Underseas Mineral Resources Act 1963, (Note: Underseas Mineral Resources Act 1963 (No. 7095)) to repeal the Petroleum (Barracouta and Marlin Fields Agreement) Act 1967 (Note: Petroleum (Barracouta and Marlin Fields Agreement) Act 1967 (No. 7540)) and the Pipelines (Submerged Lands) Act 1967 (Note: Pipelines (Submerged Lands) Act 1967 (No. 7537)) and for other purposes.
Motor Car Act 1967	No. 7593	5 December 1967
An Act to amend the Motor Car Act 1958. (Note: Motor Car Act 1958 (No. 6325))
Administration and Probate (Amendment) Act 1967	No. 7597	5 December 1967
An Act to amend Division 6 of Part I. of the Administration and Probate Act 1958 (Note: Administration and Probate Act 1958 (No. 6191)) and for other purposes.
Yea Civic Centre and Court House Act 1967	No. 7611	5 December 1967
An Act to ratify validate approve and otherwise give Effect to an Agreement between the Minister of Public Works and the President Councillors and Ratepayers of the Shire of Yea providing for the Demolition of the Yea Court House and the Construction at Yea of a Civic Centre Building containing a new Court House, and for other purposes.
Shepparton Abattoirs Act 1967 (repealed)	No. 7612	12 December 1976
An Act with respect to a Proposed Compromise between certain Contractors and Lenders and the Shire of Shepparton in relation to certain Contracts entered into and Borrowings made by the said Shire for the Purpose of the Construction and Enlargement of certain Abattoirs by the Shire and for other purposes. (Repealed by Legislation Reform (Repeals No. 2) Act 2008 (No. 16 of 2008))
Yarraville (Recreation Ground) Lands Act 1967	No. 7613	12 December 1967
An Act relating to Certain Lands at Yarraville, in the City of Footscray, Parish of Cut-paw-paw, and to authorize the Granting of Leases of a Certain Part thereof and for other purposes.
Swine Compensation Act 1967 (repealed)	No. 7614	12 December 1967
An Act to consolidate and amend the Law relating to the Provision of Compensation for the Owners of certain Pigs, to repeal the Provisions relating to the Sale of Swine contained in Part II. of the Swine Act 1958, (Note: Swine Act 1958 (No. 6389)) to amend the Stamps Act 1958, and for other purposes. (Repealed by Livestock Disease Control Act 1994 (No. 115 of 1994))
Cattle Compensation Act 1967 (repealed)	No. 7615	12 December 1967
An Act to consolidate and amend the Law relating to the Provision of Compensation for the Owners of certain Cattle, to amend the Stamps Act 1958, and for other purposes. (Repealed by Livestock Disease Control Act 1994 (No. 115 of 1994))
Harbor Charges Act 1967 or the Harbour Charges Act 1967	No. 7617	12 December 1967
An Act to amend the Melbourne Harbor Trust Act 1958 (Note: Melbourne Harbor Trust Act 1958 (No. 6312)) the Geelong Harbor Trust Act 1958 (Note: Geelong Harbor Trust Act 1958 (No. 6262)) the Portland Harbor Trust Act 1958 (Note: Portland Harbor Trust Act 1958 (No. 6340)) the Harbor Boards Act 1958 (Note: Harbor Boards Act 1958 (No. 6268)) and the Marine Act 1958. (Note: Marine Act 1958 (No. 6302))
Apprenticeship (Amendment) Act 1967	No. 7625	12 December 1967
An Act to amend the Apprenticeship Act 1958, (Note: Apprenticeship Act 1958 (No. 6199)) and for other purposes.
Geelong Gas Company's (Amendment) Act 1967 (repealed)	No. 7631	12 December 1967
An Act to make further Provision with respect to the Geelong Gas Company, to amend The Geelong Gas Company's Act 1858 and for other purposes. (Repealed by Gas and Fuel Corporation Act 1972 (No. 8318)
Sunday Entertainment Act 1967	No. 7634	19 December 1967
An Act make Provision with respect to the Holding or Conducting of Public Entertainments on Sundays and for Purposes connected therewith.
Stamps (Exemptions) Act 1967	No. 7636	19 December 1967
An Act to amend Section 131AC and the Third Schedule of the Stamps Act 1958 and to amend Section 6 of the Stamps Act 1967. (Note: Stamps Act 1967 (No. 7585))
Rain-making Control Act 1967	No. 7637	19 December 1967
An Act to regulate certain Rain-making and other Cloud-modification Processes, to make Provision with respect to Claims for Damages against Persons lawfully engaged therein and for other purposes.
Weights and Measures (Pre-packed Articles) Act 1967	No. 7639	19 December 1967
An Act to amend the Weights and Measures Act 1958 with respect to the Regulation and Control of Packaging and Sale of Pre-packed Articles, the Marking of Packages containing such Articles, the Prohibition or Restriction of the Use of certain Expressions on such Packages, and for other purposes.
Barry Beach Railway Construction Act 1967 (repealed)	No. 7642	19 December 1967
An Act to authorize the Construction of a Line of Railway to connect the Railway from Leongatha to Port Albert with Barry Beach and for other purposes. (Repealed by Transport Act 1983 (No. 9921))
Victoria Institute of Colleges Act 1967	No. 7644	19 December 1967
An Act to amend the Victoria Institute of Colleges Act 1965 (Note: Victoria Institute of Colleges Act 1965 (No. 7291)) and the Education Act 1958 (Note: Education Act 1958 (No. 6240)) and for other purposes.
Private Agents Act 1967	No. 7646	19 December 1967
An Act to amend the Private Agents Act 1966. (Note: Private Agents Act 1966 (No. 7494))
Juries Act 1967	No. 7651	19 December 1967
An Act to consolidate and amend the Law relating to Juries, to amend the Coroners Act 1958, (Note: Coroners Act 1958 (No. 6227)) the County Court Act 1958, (Note: County Court Act 1958 (No. 6230)) the Crimes Act 1958 (Note: Crimes Act 1958 (No. 6231)) and the Evidence Act 1958, (Note: Evidence Act 1958 (No. 6246)) and for other purposes.
Westernport Development Act 1967	No. 7652	19 December 1967
An Act to ratify validate approve and otherwise give Effect to an Agreement between the Premier for and on behalf of the State of Victoria and Hematite Petroleum Proprietary Limited and Esso Exploration and Production Australia Inc. to authorize the Construction of Additional Port Facilities in Westernport to make Provision with respect to the Reclamation of Certain Land at Old Tyabb and for other purposes.
North Melbourne Lands (Amendment) Act 1967	No. 7653	19 December 1967
An Act to amend the North Melbourne Lands Act 1966 (Note: North Melbourne Lands Act 1966 (No. 7446)) and for other purposes.
Water Supply Loan Application Act 1967 (repealed)	No. 7654	19 December 1967
An Act to sanction the Issue and Application of Loan Money for Works and other Purposes relating to Irrigation Water Supply Drainage Sewerage Flood Protection and River Improvement, and other purposes. (Repealed by Treasury Legislation (Repeal) Act 2005 (No. 73 of 2005))
	No. 7655	19 December 1967
An Act to apply a sum out of the Consolidated Revenue to the service of the Year ending on the thirtieth day of June One thousand nine hundred and sixty-eight and to appropriate the Supplies granted in this Session of Parliament.
Barley Marketing (Amendment) Act 1967	No.	
Building Societies (Unsecured Loans) Act 1967	No.	
Carlton (Recreation Ground) (Amendment) Land Act 1967	No.	
Cemeteries (St. Kilda Public Cemetery) Act 1967	No.	
Co-operative Housing Societies (Amendment) Act 1967	No.	
Co-operative Housing Societies (Indemnities) Act 1967	No.	
Coal Mines (Pensions) Act 1967	No.	
Country Fire Authority (Notices) Act 1967	No.	
Country Fire Authority (Prosecutions) Act 1967	No.	
Crimes (Amendment) Act 1967	No.	
Crimes (Driving Offences) Act 1967	No.	
Crimes Act 1967	No.	
Dandenong Valley Authority (Amendment) Act 1967	No.	
Dowling Forest Racecourse Lands Act 1967	No.	
Education and Teaching Service (Amendment) Act 1967	No.	
Fertilizers (Amendment) Act 1967	No.	
Firearms (Prohibited Persons) Act 1967	No.	
Fisheries (Amendment) Act 1967	No.	
Fitzroy (Edinburgh Gardens) Lands Act 1967	No.	
Friendly Societies (Investment) Act 1967	No.	
Gaols (Amendment) Act 1967	No.	
Gas Regulation (Amendment) Act 1967	No.	
Geelong Waterworks and Sewerage Act 1967	No.	
Grain Elevators (Borrowing Powers) Act 1967	No.	
Housing (Amendment) Act 1967	No.	
Instruments (Corporate Bodies Contracts) Act 1967	No.	
Joint Select Committee (Drainage) Act 1967	No.	
Joint Select Committee (Meat Industry) Act 1967	No.	
Joint Select Committee (Road Safety) Act 1967	No.	
Judges and Public Officers Salaries Act 1967	No.	
Judicial Proceedings Reports (Amendment) Act 1967	No.	
Justices (Amendment) Act 1967	No.	
Labour and Industry (Bread) Act 1967	No.	
Labour and Industry (Fees) Act 1967	No.	
Land (Amendment) Act 1967	No.	
Land (Committees of Management) Act 1967	No.	
Land (Surf Life Saving Association) Act 1967	No.	
Land Tax (Rates) Act 1967	No.	
Legal Aid (Amendment) Act 1967	No.	
Legal Profession Practice (Victoria Law Foundation) Act 1967	No.	
Licensing (Amendment) Act 1967	No.	
Licensing (Rutherglen Wine Festival) Act 1967	No.	
Lifts and Cranes Act 1967	No.	
Litter Act 1967	No.	
Local Government (Amendment) Act 1967	No.	
Local Government (Municipalities Assistance Fund) Act 1967	No.	
Maintenance (Amendment) Act 1967	No.	
Marketable Securities Act 1967	No.	
Marketing of Primary Products (Amendment) Act 1967	No.	
Masseurs (Amendment) Act 1967	No.	
Medical (Foreign Practitioners) Act 1967	No.	
Melbourne and Metropolitan Tramways (Detours) Act 1967	No.	
Melbourne Harbor Trust Land Act 1967	No.	
Mental Health (Pathological Examinations) Act 1967	No.	
Mildura Irrigation and Water Trusts (Amendment) Act 1967	No.	
Milk and Dairy Supervision (Amendment) Act 1967	No.	
Money Lenders (Corporation Licences) Act 1967	No.	
Motor Car (Compulsory Third Party Insurance) Act 1967	No.	
Motor Car (Hours of Driving) Act 1967	No.	
Municipal Association (Amendment) Act 1967	No.	
New Melbourne Cemetery Lands Act 1967	No.	
Pesticides (Amendment) Act 1967	No.	
Poisons (Amendment) Act 1967	No.	
Police Offences (Obscene Publications) Act 1967	No.	
Police Regulation (Pensions) Act 1967	No.	
Portland Harbor (Exchange of Land) Act 1967	No.	
Portland Harbor Trust (Amendment) Act 1967	No.	
Public Officers (Long Service Leave) Act 1967	No.	
Public Officers Salaries and Allowances Act 1967	No.	
Public Works Loan Application Act 1967	No.	
Racing Act 1967	No.	
Railway Loan Application Act 1967	No.	
Railways (State Coal Mine Officers) Act 1967	No.	
Revocation and Excision of Crown Reservations (No. 2) Act 1967	No.	
Revocation and Excision of Crown Reservations Act 1967	No.	
Richmond High School Land Act 1967	No.	
Ringwood and Warrandyte Lands Act 1967	No.	
Rural Finance (Amendment) Act 1967	No.	
Second-hand Dealers (Amendment) Act 1967	No.	
Social Welfare (Detention) Act 1967	No.	
State Forests Loan Application Act 1967	No.	
State Savings Bank (Amendment) Act 1967	No.	
Stock (Artificial Breeding) (Amendment) Act 1967	No.	
Stock Foods (Amendment) Act 1967	No.	
Summary Offences Act 1967	No.	
Superannuation (Amendment) Act 1967	No.	
Supreme and County Courts (Sittings) Act 1967	No.	
Supreme Court (Judges) Act 1967	No.	
Teaching Service (Teachers Tribunal) Act 1967	No.	
Tobacco Leaf Marketing Board (Appointment of Manager) (Amendment) Act 1967	No.	
Veterinary Surgeons (Amendment) Act 1967	No.	
Victoria Institute of Colleges (Board of Studies) Act 1967	No.	

== Sources ==
- "1967 Victorian Historical Acts". AustLII.
