= List of acts of the Parliament of Victoria from 1951 =

This is a list of acts of the Parliament of Victoria, Australia for the year 1951.

== 1951 ==
Short title, or popular name	Citation	Royal assent
Long title
	No. 5528	28 June 1951
An Act to apply out of the Consolidated Revenue the sum of Nine million four hundred and ninety thousand four hundred and thirty-two pounds to the service of the year One thousand nine hundred and fifty-one and One thousand nine hundred and fifty-two.
Geelong Gas Company's Act 1951	No. 5532	24 July 1951
An Act to further amend The Geelong Gas Company's Act 1858. (Note: Geelong Gas Company's Act 1858 (21 Vict. No. 57))
	No. 5543	21 August 1951
An Act to apply out of the Consolidated Revenue the sum of Nine million five hundred and sixty-nine thousand three hundred and fifteen pounds to the service of the year One thousand nine hundred and fifty-one and One thousand nine hundred and fifty-two.
	No. 5547	28 August 1951
An Act to apply out of the Consolidated Revenue the sum of Two million seven hundred and seventy-two thousand four hundred and eighty pounds to the service of the year One thousand nine hundred and fifty and One thousand nine hundred and fifty-one.
Railways Dismantling Act 1951 (repealed)	No. 5552	4 September 1951
An Act to provide for the Dismantling of certain Railways and Sections of Railways, and for other purposes. (Repealed by Transport Act 1983 (No. 9921))
Newport "A" Power Station Act 1951	No. 5554	11 September 1951
An Act relating to the Transfer of the Newport "A" Power Station to the State Electricity Commission of Victoria.
Winchelsea Coal Mine Act 1951 (repealed)	No. 5557	25 September 1951
An Act relating to the Purchase Working and Sale of an Open Cut Brown Coal Mine near Winchelsea. (Repealed by Legislation Reform (Repeals No. 3) Act 2008 (No. 53 of 2008))
Special Funds (Amendment) Act 1951 (repealed)	No. 5558	9 October 1951
An Act to amend Section Seven of the Special Funds Act 1910. (Note: Special Funds Act 1910 (1 Geo. V. No. 2297)) (Repealed by Statute Law Revision Act 1995 (No. 11 of 1995))
	No. 5568	30 October 1951
An Act to apply out of the Consolidated Revenue the sum of Ten million eight hundred and sixty-three thousand five hundred and seventy-nine pounds to the service of the year One thousand nine hundred and fifty-one and One thousand nine hundred and fifty-two.
University Act 1951	No. 5579	7 November 1951
An Act to amend Sections Eighteen and Thirty-three of the University Act 1928. (Note: University Act 1928 (19 Geo. V. No. 3795))
Land (Development Leases) Act 1951	No. 5585	7 November 1951
An Act relating to the Granting of Development Leases of certain Lands.
Administration and Probate (Estates) Act 1951	No. 5590	7 November 1951
An Act relating to Duties on Deceased Persons' Estates, to amend Part VI. of the Administration and Probate Act 1928, (Note: Administration and Probate Act 1928 (19 Geo. V. No. 3632)) and for other purposes.
Kerang and Koondrook Tramway Act 1951 (repealed)	No. 5591	7 November 1951
An Act to provide for the Transfer from the Shire of Kerang to The Victorian Railways Commissioners of the Kerang and Koondrook Tramway, and for other purposes. (Repealed by Transport Act 1983 (No. 9921))
Ballaarat Gas Company's Act 1951 (repealed)	No. 5592	7 November 1951
An Act to amend Section Eleven of The Ballaarat Gas Company's Act 1857. (Note: Ballaarat Gas Company's Act 1857 (21 Vict. No. 27)) (Repealed by Statute Law Revision Act 1995 (No. 11 of 1995))
Revocation and Excision of Crown Reservations Act 1951 (repealed)	No. 5593	7 November 1951
An Act to provide for the Revocation of the Permanent Reservations and Crown Grants of certain Lands, and for other purposes. (Repealed by Statute Law Revision Act 1984 (No. 10087))
Statute Law Revision Act 1951	No. 5602	11 December 1951
An Act to revise and amend the Statute Law and for other purposes.
Firearms Act 1951	No. 5610	11 December 1951
An Act to amend and consolidate the Law relating to Firearms.
Motor Car Act 1951 (repealed)	No. 5616	18 December 1951
An Act to consolidate the Law relating to Motor Cars. (Repealed by Motor Car Act 1958 (No. 6325))
Public Works Loan Application Act 1951 (repealed)	No. 5618	18 December 1951
An Act to sanction the Issue and Application of Loan Monies for Public Works and other Purposes. (Repealed by Treasury Legislation (Repeal) Act 2005 (No. 73 of 2005))
	No. 5619	18 December 1951
An Act to apply a sum out of the Consolidated Revenue to the service of the year ending on the thirtieth day of June One thousand nine hundred and fifty-two and to appropriate the Supplies granted in this and the last preceding Session of Parliament.
Bendigo (Rosalind Park) Lands Act 1951	No.	
Benefit Associations Act 1951	No.	
Building Operations and Building Materials Control (Extension) Act 1951	No.	
Co-operative Housing Societies (Amendment) Act 1951	No.	
Coal Mines Workers Pensions (Contributions) Act 1951	No.	
Coal Mining Industry (Long Service Leave) Amendment Act 1951	No.	
Country Fire Authority (Financial) Act 1951	No.	
Crimes (Reformatory Prisons) Act 1951	No.	
Education (Amendment) Act 1951	No.	
Egg and Egg Pulp Marketing Board Act 1951	No.	
Factories and Shops (Registration Fees) Act 1951	No.	
Firearms Offences Act 1951	No.	
Friendly Societies (Amendment) Act 1951	No.	
Friendly Societies Act 1951	No.	
Geelong Harbor Trust (Amendment) Act 1951	No.	
Gippsland Railway (Duplication and Regrading) Extension Act 1951	No.	
Grace Joel Scholarship Act 1951	No.	
Health (Radiological Examinations) Act 1951	No.	
Imported Materials Loan and Application (Financial) Act 1951	No.	
Judges and Public Officers Salaries Act 1951	No.	
Justices (Service of Process) Act 1951	No.	
Land Tax Act 1951	No.	
Lands (Charitable Trusts) Act 1951	No.	
Latrobe Valley Drainage Act 1951	No.	
Licensing (Fees) Act 1951	No.	
Licensing (Mildura) Act 1951	No.	
Local Government (Enrolment) Act 1951	No.	
Local Government (Imported Houses) Act 1951	No.	
Local Government (Overdrafts) Act 1951	No.	
Local Government (Warrnambool) Act 1951	No.	
Marine (Amendment) Act 1951	No.	
Marine (Pilotage Rates) Act 1951	No.	
Marketing of Primary Products (Egg and Egg Pulp) Act 1951	No.	
Marketing of Primary Products (Tomatoes) Act 1951	No.	
Medical (Temporary Registration) Act 1951	No.	
Melbourne and Metropolitan Board of Works (Borrowing Powers) Act 1951	No.	
Melbourne Cricket Ground Act 1951	No.	
Melbourne Harbor Trust Act 1951	No.	
Milk Board Act 1951	No.	
Motor Car (Registration Fees) Act 1951	No.	
Parliamentary Contributory Retirement Fund Act 1951	No.	
Parliamentary Salaries Act 1951	No.	
Poisons Act 1951	No.	
Police Regulation (Furlough) Act 1951	No.	
Portland Harbor Trust (Amendment) Act 1951	No.	
Prices Regulation (Amendment) Act 1951	No.	
Public Account Act 1951	No.	
Public Service Act 1951	No.	
Railway Loan Application Act 1951	No.	
Railways (Amendment) Act 1951	No.	
Railways (Furlough) Act 1951	No.	
Revenue Deficit Funding Act 1951	No.	
Select Committee (Egg and Egg Pulp Marketing) Act 1951	No.	
Soldier Settlement Act 1951	No.	
Solicitor-General Act 1951	No.	
Stamps (Betting Tax) Act 1951	No.	
Stamps (Cheques) Act 1951	No.	
Stamps (Duties) Act 1951	No.	
State Development Act 1951	No.	
State Electricity Commission (Overdraft) Act 1951	No.	
State Forests Loan Application Act 1951	No.	
Transfer of Land (Forgeries) Act 1951	No.	
Transport Act 1951	No.	
Transport Regulation (Fees) Act 1951	No.	
Transport Regulation Board Act 1951	No.	
Vermin and Noxious Weeds (Financial) Act 1951	No.	
Water (Amendment) Act 1951	No.	
Water Supply Loan Application Act 1951	No.	
Wheat Industry Stablization (Amendment) Act 1951	No.	
Woorayl (Unimproved Rating Poll) Act 1951	No.	
Workers Compensation Act 1951	No.	
Wrongs (Contributory Negligence) Act 1951	No.	

== Sources ==
- "1951 Victorian Historical Acts". AustLII.
