= List of acts of the Parliament of Victoria from 1950 =

This is a list of acts of the Parliament of Victoria, Australia for the year 1950.

== 1950 ==
Short title, or popular name	Citation	Royal assent
Long title
	No. 5451	30 June 1950
An Act to apply out of the Consolidated Revenue the sum of Seven million seven hundred and six thousand seven hundred and eighty-five pounds to the service of the year One thousand nine hundred and fifty and One thousand nine hundred and fifty-one.
	No. 5452	30 June 1950
An Act to apply out of the Consolidated Revenue the sum of Two million three hundred and sixty-one thousand five hundred and ninety-seven pounds to the service of the year One thousand nine hundred and forty-nine and One thousand nine hundred and fifty.
	No. 5455	1 September 1950
An Act to apply out of the Consolidated Revenue the sum of Seven million five hundred and fifty thousand five hundred and eighty-three pounds to the service of the year One thousand nine hundred and fifty and One thousand nine hundred and fifty-one.
University (Veterinary Research) Act 1950	No. 5457	19 September 1950
An Act to amend the University (Veterinary Research) Act 1945. (Note: University (Veterinary Research) Act 1945 (No. 5092))
Melbourne (Bowen-street) Land Act 1950 (repealed)	No. 5461	4 October 1950
An Act to provide for the Closing of Bowen-street and part of an adjoining Lane in the City of Melbourne and to validate certain Crown Grants and Reservations, and for other purposes. (Repealed by Statute Law Revision Act 1984 (No. 10087))
	No. 5474	31 October 1950
An Act to apply out of the Consolidated Revenue the sum of Seven million nine hundred and seventy-five thousand three hundred and ninety-nine pounds to the service of the year One thousand nine hundred and fifty and One thousand nine hundred and fifty-one.
Acts Interpretation (Amendment) Act 1950	No. 5477	8 November 1950
An Act to amend Section Six of the Acts Interpretation Act 1928. (Note: Acts Interpretation Act 1928 (19 Geo. V. No. 3630))
Agricultural Colleges (Amendment) Act 1950	No. 5478	8 November 1950
An Act to further amend Section Five of the Agricultural Colleges Act 1944. (Note: Agricultural Colleges Act 1944 (No. 5044))
Public Works Loan and Application Act 1950	No. 5481	14 November 1950
An Act to authorize the Raising of Money for Public Works and other Purposes and to sanction the Issue and Application for such Purposes of the Money so raised or of Money in the State Loans Repayment Fund, and for other purposes.
Administration and Probate Duties Act 1950	No. 5493	28 November 1950
An Act to continue the Operation of Part III. of the Finance Act 1930. (Note: Finance Act 1930 (No. 3889))
Gas and Fuel Corporation Act 1950	No. 5507	
An Act to approve validate ratify and otherwise give effect to an Agreement between the State of Victoria The Metropolitan Gas Company and The Brighton Gas Company Limited, to establish constitute and incorporate a Public Authority to be called the "Gas and Fuel Corporation of Victoria", to make provision with respect to the Objects Powers and Duties of such Authority, to provide for the Raising of Money by the State and the Application of such Money, and for other purposes.
Jubilee and Centenary Sports Act 1950	No. 5508	11 December 1950
An Act relating to Sports in connexion with the Celebration of the Jubilee of the Commonwealth of Australia and the Centenary of Government in Victoria.
Railways Dismantling Act 1950 (repealed)	No. 5509	11 December 1950
An Act to provide for the Dismantling of Sections of certain Railways, and for other purposes. (Repealed by Transport Act 1983 (No. 9921))
Geelong (Kardinia Park) Land Act 1950	No. 5510	11 December 1950
An Act to adjust the Common Boundaries of Two Reserves in the City of Geelong.
Public Works Loan and Application Act 1950 (No. 2) (repealed)	No. 5515	11 December 1950
An Act to authorize the Raising of further Money for Public Works and other Purposes and to sanction the Issue and Application for such Purposes of the Money so raised or of Money in the State Loans Repayment Fund, and for other purposes. (Repealed by Treasury Legislation (Repeal) Act 2005 (No. 73 of 2005))
McPherson's Limited Pension Fund Act 1950 (repealed)	No. 5524	11 December 1950
An Act to remove Doubts as to the Validity of the Trusts of a Pension Fund established under a Trust Instrument of McPherson's Proprietary Limited, to provide for the Alteration of the said Instrument and to incorporate the Trustees of the said Fund. (Repealed by Statute Law Revision Act 1995 (No. 11 of 1995))
	No. 5527	11 December 1950
An Act to apply a sum out of the Consolidated Revenue to the service of the year ending on the thirtieth day of June One thousand nine hundred and fifty-one and to appropriate the Supplies granted in this Session of Parliament.
Building Operations and Building Materials Control (Amendment) Act 1950	No.	
Cattle Compensation Act 1950	No.	
Co-operative Housing Societies Act 1950	No.	
Coal Mine Workers Pensions (Amendment) Act 1950	No.	
Coal Mines Regulation (Accidents Relief) Act 1950	No.	
Coal Mining Industry (Long Service Leave) Act 1950	No.	
Country Roads Board Act 1950	No.	
Drainage Areas Act 1950	No.	
Education (Religious Instruction) Act 1950	No.	
Factories and Shops (Amendment) Act 1950	No.	
Fire Brigades (Long Service Leave) Act 1950	No.	
Fisheries (Inland Angling) Act 1950	No.	
Forests (Accounts and Funds) Act 1950	No.	
Goods (Textile Products) Act 1950	No.	
Grain Elevators Act 1950	No.	
Imported Materials Loan and Application (Amendment) Act 1950	No.	
Land Tax Act 1950	No.	
Landlord and Tenant (Servicemen) Act 1950	No.	
Legislative Council Reform Act 1950	No.	
Local Government (Imported Houses) Act 1950	No.	
Local Government (Shire of Braybrook) Act 1950	No.	
Marine (Temporary Exemptions) Act 1950	No.	
Medical Act 1950	No.	
Melbourne and Metropolitan Board of Works (Borrowing Powers) Act 1950	No.	
Melbourne and Metropolitan Board of Works (Contracts) Act 1950	No.	
Melbourne Harbor Trust (Housing Advances) Act 1950	No.	
Mental Hygiene Authority Act 1950	No.	
Ministers of the Crown and Parliamentary Salaries Act 1950	No.	
Motor Car (Drivers' Licences) Act 1950	No.	
Municipalities and Other Authorities Finances Act 1950	No.	
Non-Contributory State Pensions Act 1950	No.	
Nurses and Midwives Act 1950	No.	
Police Offences (Animals) Act 1950	No.	
Police Offences (Idle and Disorderly Persons) Act 1950	No.	
Police Offences (Race-meetings) Act 1950	No.	
Police Regulation (Pensions) Act 1950	No.	
Police Regulation (Pensions) Amendment Act 1950	No.	
Prices Regulation (Extension) Act 1950	No.	
Printers and Newspapers (Foreign Advertisements) Act 1950	No.	
Public Contracts (Amendment) Act 1950	No.	
Public Officers Salaries Act 1950	No.	
Public Trustee Act 1950	No.	
Pyalong Lands Exchange Act 1950	No.	
Railway Loan and Application Act 1950	No.	
Shrine of Remembrance Site Act 1950	No.	
State Electricity Commission (Contracts) Act 1950	No.	
State Electricity Commission Act 1950	No.	
State Forests Loan and Application Act 1950	No.	
Superannuation Act 1950	No.	
Supreme Court (Judges) Act 1950	No.	
Surplus Revenue (Unexpected Balances) Act 1950	No.	
Tallangatta Township (Removal) Act 1950	No.	
Teaching Service (Amendment) Act 1950	No.	
Treasury Bonds Act 1950	No.	
Victorian Inland Meat Authority (Advances) Act 1950	No.	
Water Act 1950	No.	
Water Supply Loan and Application Act 1950	No.	
Weights and Measures Act 1950	No.	
Workers' Compensation (Amendment) Act 1950	No.	

== Sources ==
- "1950 Victorian Historical Acts". AustLII.
