= List of acts of the Parliament of Victoria from 1971 =

This is a list of acts of the Parliament of Victoria, Australia for the year 1971.

== 1971 ==
Short title, or popular name	Citation	Royal assent
Long title
Snowy Mountains Engineering Corporation (Victoria) Act 1971	No. 8098	27 April 1971
An Act relating to the Performance of Work within Victoria by the Snowy Mountains Engineering Corporation.
Albert Park Land Act 1971	No. 8099	27 April 1971
An Act to provide for Closing of Part of Bridport-street at Albert Park in the City of South Melbourne, and for other purposes.
Presbyterian Church of Australia Act 1971	No. 8102	27 April 1971
An Act to vary the Trusts of Property in Victoria held for the Purposes of the Presbyterian Church of Victoria and to enable certain Arrangements entered into between the Presbyterian Churches of New South Wales, Victoria, Queensland, South Australia, Tasmania and Western Australia to be carried into Effect and for other purposes.
Gas and Fuel Corporation (Geelong Gas) Act 1971	No. 8104	27 April 1971
An Act to make Provision with respect to a proposed Offer by the Gas and Fuel Corporation of Victoria for the Shares in The Geelong Gas Company (Note: Geelong Gas Company.) and for other purposes.
Howard Florey Institute of Experimental Physiology and Medicine Act 1971	No. 8108	27 April 1971
An Act to establish a Body Corporate under the Name of the Howard Florey Institute of Experimental Physiology and Medicine and for other Purposes in connexion therewith.
New Broken Hill Consolidated Limited Act 1971 (Note: The corresponding act in the UK was the New Broken Hill Consolidated Limited Act 1971 (c. xxvi (UK)).)	No. 8110	27 April 1971
An Act to authorize New Broken Hill Consolidated Limited to become a Company deemed to be incorporated in Victoria, to preserve the Identity of the Company so incorporated with New Broken Hill Consolidated Limited an existing Company within the meaning of the Companies Act 1948 (Note: Companies Act 1948 (11 & 12 Geo. 6. c. 38 (UK))) of the United Kingdom, to determine the Amount that will be paid to the State of Victoria in lieu of Duties that may have been payable under the Stamps Act 1958 (Note: Stamps Act 1958 (No. 6375)) and for other purposes.
Alcoa of Australia (W.A.) N.L. Act 1971 (Note: WA stands for 'Western Aluminium'; NL stands for 'No Liability'.)	No. 8114	27 April 1971
An Act to make Provision with respect to the Conversion of Alcoa of Australia (W.A.) N.L. to a Public Company with Limited Liability and Purposes connected therewith.
Forests (Bowater-Scott Agreement) Act 1971	No. 8121	4 May 1971
An Act to ratify validate approve and otherwise give effect to an Agreement between the Forests Commission and Bowater-Scott Australia Limited with respect to the Establishment of an Industry for the Manufacture of Wood Pulp from Softwood Timber obtained from Forests under the Control of the Forests Commission, and for other purposes.
Gas and Fuel Corporation (Pipelines) Act 1971 (repealed)	No. 8122	4 May 1971
An Act to abolish the Victorian Pipelines Commission, to vest certain of the Powers, Duties, Functions and Obligations of the Victorian Pipelines Commission in the Gas and Fuel Corporation of Victoria and for other purposes. (Repealed by Treasury Legislation (Repeal) Act 2005 (No. 73 of 2005))
Imperial Acts Application (Repeals) Act 1971	No. 8137	4 May 1971
An Act to amend the Imperial Acts Application Act 1922. (Note: Imperial Acts Application Act 1922 (13 Geo. V. No. 3270))
Scaffolding Act 1971	No. 8146	4 May 1971
An Act to make Provision with respect to the Erection and Use of Scaffolding and for other purposes.
Local Government (Further Amendment) Act 1971	No. 8149	4 May 1971
An Act to amend the Local Government Act 1958 (Note: Local Government Act 1958 (No. 6299)) the Melbourne and Geelong Corporations Act 1938 (Note: Melbourne and Geelong Corporations Act 1938 (No. 4574)) and the Health Act 1958, (Note: Health Act 1958 (No. 6270)) to repeal the Melbourne Buildings Act 1849, (Note: Melbourne Buildings Act 1849 (13 Vict. No. 39 (NSW))) and for other purposes.
Pay-roll Tax Act 1971 (repealed)	No. 8154	8 October 1971
An Act to impose a Tax upon Employers in respect of certain Wages, to provide for the Assessment and Collection of the Tax, and for Purposes connected therewith. (Repealed by Payroll Tax Act 2007 (No. 26 of 2007))
Moonee Ponds (Queens Park) Land Act 1971	No. 8155	19 October 1971
An Act to authorize the Grant of Leases in respect of certain Land at Moonee Ponds in the City of Essendon and for other purposes.
Commonwealth Places (Administration of Laws) Act 1971	No. 8156	19 October 1971
An Act to amend the Commonwealth Places (Administration of Laws) Act 1970. (Note: Commonwealth Places (Administration of Laws) Act 1970 (No. 8026))
Mercy Private Hospital (Guarantee) Act 1971	No. 8158	26 October 1971
An Act to authorize the Treasurer of Victoria to guarantee Repayment of certain Moneys proposed to be borrowed by the Sisters of Mercy Property Association and for other purposes.
Daylight Saving Act 1971	No. 8159	26 October 1971
An Act to promote the greater Use of Daylight in certain Months of the Year and to provide for matters incidental thereto.
Films Act 1971	No. 8161	26 October 1971
An Act to consolidate and amend the Law relating to Films and for other purposes.
Newhaven Land Act 1971	No. 8166	3 November 1971
An Act to authorize the Granting of Leases of certain Land in the Township of Newhaven, Parish of Phillip Island.
Gift Duty Act 1971	No. 8176	23 November 1971
An Act to provide for the Imposition, Assessment and Collection of a Duty on certain Gifts, to amend the Stamps Act 1958 and for other purposes.
Statute Law Revision Act 1971	No. 8181	23 November 1971
An Act to revise the Statute Law.
Magistrates' Courts Act 1971 (repealed)	No. 8184	23 November 1971
An Act with respect to the Holding and Constitution of Magistrates' Courts the Appointment Powers Duties and Protection of Stipendiary Magistrates Justices and Clerks of Magistrates' Courts and for other purposes. (Repealed by Magistrates' Court Act 1989 (No. 51 of 1989))
Companies Act 1971	No. 8185	30 November 1971
An Act to make Provision with respect to the Disclosure of Substantial Shareholdings in Companies, to re-enact Provisions of the Companies Act 1961 (Note: Companies Act 1961 (No. 6839)) relating to Accounts and Audit, and to Take-over Offers, to amend the Companies Act 1961 and for other purposes.
Essendon (Recreation Ground) Land Act 1971	No. 8187	30 November 1971
An Act to authorize the Granting of Leases of certain Land in the City of Essendon permanently reserved as a Site for Public Recreation, and for other purposes.
Brotherhood of St. Laurence (Incorporation) Act 1971	No. 8188	30 November 1971
An Act to dissolve St. Laurence Trust Proprietary Limited and St. Laurence Industries Pty. Limited, to establish a Body Corporate to be called the Brotherhood of St. Laurence, to vest certain Properties in such Body Corporate, and for other purposes.
Flinders Street Station Area Redevelopment Act 1971 (repealed)	No. 8194	30 November 1971
An Act to ratify and approve an Agreement relating to certain Lands used for the Purposes of the Flinders Street Railway Station and certain other Lands used for Railway Purposes, and make other Provision in connexion with the said Agreement. (Repealed by Transport Act 1983 (No. 9921))
Yarragon Lands Exchange Act 1971	No. 8201	30 November 1971
An Act to make Provision with respect to the Surrender to Her Majesty of certain Land in the Township of Yarragon and the Grant to the Corporation of the Shire of Narracan of certain other Land in that Township.
Eastern Freeway Lands Act 1971	No. 8204	7 December 1971
An Act relating to certain Lands in the Cities of Northcote, Kew and Camberwell.
National Parks (Amendment) Act 1971	No. 8210	14 December 1971
An Act to amend the National Parks Act 1970 (Note: National Parks Act 1970 (No. 8083)) and for other purposes.
Water Supply Works and Services Act 1971 (repealed)	No. 8215	14 December 1971
An Act to authorize Expenditure on Works and Services and other Purposes relating to Irrigation Water Supply Drainage Sewerage Flood Protection and River Improvement, and other purposes. (Repealed by Treasury Legislation (Repeal) Act 2005 (No. 73 of 2005))
Bees Act 1971 (repealed)	No. 8216	14 December 1971
An Act to regulate the Keeping of Bees, to prevent the Spread of Disease amongst Bees and for other purposes. (Repealed by Livestock Disease Control Act 1994 (No. 115 of 1994))
Scaffolding (Amendment) Act 1971 (repealed)	No. 8222	14 December 1971
An Act to amend the Scaffolding Act 1971. (Note: Scaffolding Act 1971 (No. 8146)) (Repealed by Statute Law Revision Act 1984 (No. 10087))
Eastern Railway Construction Act 1971	No. 8235	14 December 1971
An Act to authorize the Construction of a Line of Railway to connect the Railway from Melbourne to Clifton Hill with East Doncaster, and for other purposes.
Appropriation Act 1971	No. 8241	14 December 1971
An Act to apply a Sum out of the Consolidated Fund to the Service of the Year ending on the Thirtieth Day of June One Thousand Nine Hundred and Seventy-two and to appropriate the Supplies granted in this and the last preceding Session of Parliament.
Aboriginal Lands (Amendment) Act 1971	No.	
Agricultural Colleges (Amendment) Act 1971	No.	
Appeal Costs Fund Act 1971	No.	
Apprenticeship (Amendment) Act 1971	No.	
Audit (Recovery of Overpayments) Act 1971	No.	
Barley Marketing Act 1971	No.	
Building Societies (Amendment) Act 1971	No.	
Building Societies (Special Advances) Act 1971	No.	
Buninyong (Recreation Reserve) Land Act 1971	No.	
Cemeteries (Fawkner Crematorium and Memorial Park) Act 1971	No.	
Chiropodists (Registration) Act 1971	No.	
Churchill Water and Sewerage Works Act 1971	No.	
Closer Settlement Act 1971	No.	
Co-operative Housing Societies (Indemnities) Act 1971	No.	
Coal Mines (Pensions Increase) Act 1971	No.	
Coal Mines (Pensions) Act 1971	No.	
Country Roads (Amendment) Act 1971	No.	
County Court (Jurisdiction) Act 1971	No.	
Crown Proceedings (Forfeited Recognisances) Act 1971	No.	
Education (Teacher Registration) Act 1971	No.	
Educational Grants (Amendment) Act 1971	No.	
Ehrenhaus Retail Bottled Liquor Licence Act 1971	No.	
Evidence (Boards and Commissions) Act 1971	No.	
Evidence (Documents) Act 1971	No.	
Evidence (Registration of Commissioners) Act 1971	No.	
Exhibition (Borrowing Powers) Act 1971	No.	
Farm Produce Merchants and Commission Agents (Employment) Act 1971	No.	
Firearms Act 1971	No.	
Fisheries (Amendment) Act 1971	No.	
Geelong Harbor Trust (Amendment) Act 1971	No.	
Geelong Land (Special Grant) Act 1971	No.	
Geelong Waterworks and Sewerage (Rates) Act 1971	No.	
Gift Duty (Rates and Rebates) Act 1971	No.	
Grain Elevators (Amendment) Act 1971	No.	
Grassmere Land Act 1971	No.	
Groundwater (Amendment) Act 1971	No.	
Harbor Boards (Amendment) Act 1971	No.	
Health (Tuberculosis Arrangement) Act 1971	No.	
Health Services (Fees and Penalties) Act 1971	No.	
Hire-Purchase (Form) Act 1971	No.	
Housing (Amendment) Act 1971	No.	
Instruments (Amendment) Act 1971	No.	
Judges Salaries and Allowances Act 1971	No.	
Juries (Compensation) Act 1971	No.	
Justices (Civil Proceedings) Act 1971	No.	
Justices (Service of Summonses) Act 1971	No.	
Labour and Industry (Amendment) Act 1971	No.	
Labour and Industry (Shop Trading Hours) Act 1971	No.	
Land (Amendment) Act 1971	No.	
Land (Surrender to the Crown) Act 1971	No.	
Land (Surrenders) Act 1971	No.	
Land Tax Act 1971	No.	
Landlord and Tenant (Amendment) Act 1971	No.	
Latrobe Valley (Amendment) Act 1971	No.	
Liquor Control (Amendment) Act 1971	No.	
Litter (Proceedings for Offences) Act 1971	No.	
Local Authorities Superannuation (Disability Benefits) (Commencement) Act 1971	No.	
Local Government (Municipalities Assistance Fund) Act 1971	No.	
Lotteries Gaming and Betting (Pre-Post Betting) Act 1971	No.	
Lutheran Church of Australia Victorian District Incorporation Act 1971	No.	
Marketing of Primary Products (Amendment) Act 1971	No.	
Melbourne and Metropolitan Board of Works (Amendment) Act 1971	No.	
Melbourne Harbor Trust (Amendment) Act 1971	No.	
Melbourne University Land Act 1971	No.	
Mildura Irrigation and Water Trusts (Amendment) Act 1971	No.	
Milk and Dairy Supervision (Amendment) Act 1971	No.	
Motor Car (Breath Tests) Act 1971	No.	
Motor Car (Driving Offences) Act 1971	No.	
Municipal Association (Amendment) Act 1971	No.	
Parliamentary Superannuation Act 1971	No.	
Pipelines (Amendment) Act 1971	No.	
Poisons (Amendment) Act 1971	No.	
Police Regulation (Amendment) (No. 2) Act 1971	No.	
Police Regulation (Amendment) Act 1971	No.	
Police Regulation (Chief Commissioner) Act 1971	No.	
Portland Harbor Trust (Amendment) Act 1971	No.	
Protection of Animals (Rodeos) Act 1971	No.	
Public Authorities (Contributions) (Amendment) Act 1971	No.	
Public Trustee (Amendment) Act 1971	No.	
Public Works and Services Act 1971	No.	
Public Works and State Development Committees Act 1971	No.	
Racing (Amendment) Act 1971	No.	
Railway Works and Services Act 1971	No.	
Railways (Amendment) Act 1971	No.	
Revocation and Excision of Crown Reservations Act 1971	No.	
Road Traffic (Penalties) Act 1971	No.	
Seeds Act 1971	No.	
Sewerage Districts (Amendment) Act 1971	No.	
Soil Conservation and Land Utilization (Amendment) Act 1971	No.	
Stamps (Credit Business) Act 1971	No.	
Stamps (Gifts and Settlements) Act 1971	No.	
Stamps Act 1971	No.	
State Electricity Commission (Newport Power Station) Act 1971	No.	
State Forests Works and Services Act 1971	No.	
Statutory Salaries Act 1971	No.	
Stock (Artificial Breeding) (Amendment) Act 1971	No.	
Stock Diseases (Composite Licences) Act 1971	No.	
Subordinate Legislation (Powers) Act 1971	No.	
Summary Offences (Amendment) Act 1971	No.	
Sunday Entertainment (Cinematograph Films) Act 1971	No.	
Superannuation (Railway Service) Act 1971	No.	
Superannuation (Transitional Provisions) Act 1971	No.	
Supply (Final Supplementary Estimates) Act 1971	No.	
Supply (July to September) Act 1971	No.	
Supply (October to December) Act 1971	No.	
Supply (Supplementary Estimates) Act 1971	No.	
Supply (Supplementary Estimates) Act 1971 (No. 2)	No.	
Survey Co-ordination (Place Names) Act 1971	No.	
Town and Country Planning (Amendment) Act 1971	No.	
Transfer of Land (Duplicate Certificates) Act 1971	No.	
Trustee Companies (Equity Trustees) Act 1971	No.	
Vegetation and Vine Diseases (Amendment) Act 1971	No.	
Vermin and Noxious Weeds (Amendment) Act 1971	No.	
Veterinary Surgeons (Amendment) Act 1971	No.	
Victoria Institute of Colleges (Amendment) Act 1971	No.	
Water (Amendment) Act 1971	No.	
Water Authorities Accident Insurance Act 1971	No.	
Wheat Marketing Act 1971	No.	

== Sources ==
- "1971 Victorian Historical Acts". AustLII.
