= List of acts of the Parliament of Victoria from 1956 =

This is a list of acts of the Parliament of Victoria, Australia for the year 1956.

== 1956 ==
Short title, or popular name	Citation	Royal assent
Long title
Serviceton Public Hall Act 1956	No. 5942	15 May 1956
An Act to authorize an Agreement between the Trustees of the Victorian Railways Institute Trust and the Serviceton Public Hall Committee relating to the Provision of a Hall for the Public at Serviceton.
Returned Servicemen's Badges Act 1956	No. 5948	22 May 1956
An Act to prohibit the Unauthorized Use or Possession of Membership Badges issued by the Returned Sailors' Soldiers' and Airmen's Imperial League of Australia, Victorian Branch.
North Carlton Land Act 1956 (repealed)	No. 5951	22 May 1956
An Act to provide for the Revocation of the Permanent Reservation and Crown Grant of Portion of certain Land in North Carlton in the City of Melbourne. (Repealed by Statute Law Revision Act 1984 (No. 10087))
Operation Gratitude Race Meeting Act 1956	No. 5954	22 May 1956
An Act to authorize the Holding of a Race Meeting Moonee Valley Racecourse on the Fifteenth day of August One thousand nine hundred and fifty-six, and for other purposes.
Melbourne College of Divinity (Amendment) Act 1956 (repealed)	No. 5956	22 May 1956
An Act to amend the Melbourne College of Divinity Act 1910. (Note: Melbourne College of Divinity Act 1910 (1 Geo. V. No. 2275)) (Repealed by Statute Law Revision Act 1995 (No. 11 of 1995))
Victoria Racing Club Act 1956	No. 5960	29 May 1956
An Act to amend Section Twenty-six of The Victoria Racing Club Act 1871, (Note: Victoria Racing Club Act 1871 (35 Vict. No. 398)) and for other purposes.
	No. 5964	6 June 1956
An Act to apply out of the Consolidated Revenue the sum of Twenty-three million eight hundred and seventy-one thousand two hundred and fifty pounds to the service of the year One thousand nine hundred and fifty-six and One thousand nine hundred and fifty-seven.
Public Officers Salaries and Allowances Act 1956 (repealed)	No. 5970	6 June 1956
An Act relating to the Salaries Allowances and Fees of certain Public Officers. (Repealed by Statute Law Revision Act 1995 (No. 11 of 1995))
Geelong Gas Company's Act 1956	No. 5976	12 June 1956
An Act to further amend The Geelong Gas Company's Act 1858. (Note: Geelong Gas Company's Act 1858 (21 Vict. No. 57))
St. Kilda and Brighton Electric Street Railway (Partial Dismantling) Act 1956 (repealed)	No. 5977	12 June 1956
An Act relating to the Discontinuance of the Service on and the Dismantling of that Part of the St. Kilda and Brighton Electric Street Railway which lies in the City of Brighton, and for other purposes. (Repealed by Transport Act 1983 (No. 9921))
Constitution Act Amendment (Committee of Public Accounts) Act 1956	No. 5987	12 June 1956
An Act to amend Section Three hundred and seventy-four of The Constitution Act Amendment Act 1928. (Note: Constitution Act Amendment Act 1928 (19 Geo. V. No. 3660))
Freedom of the City of Melbourne Act 1956	No. 5990	25 September 1956
An Act relating to the Freedom of the City of Melbourne.
West Melbourne Market Land Act 1956 (repealed)	No. 5993	2 October 1956
An Act to provide for the Crown Grant to the Lord Mayor Councillors and Citizens of the City of Melbourne of certain Land at West Melbourne to be used as a Site for a Market and for other Municipal Purposes. (Repealed by Statute Law Revision Act 1984 (No. 10087))
	No. 5994	2 October 1956
An Act to apply out of the Consolidated Revenue the sum of Seventeen million seven hundred and sixteen thousand nine hundred and ninety-five pounds to the service of the year One thousand nine hundred and fifty-six and One thousand nine hundred and fifty-seven.
Administration and Probate Act 1956	No. 5996	8 October 1956
An Act to re-enact Section Forty-five of the Administration and Probate Act 1928. (Note: Administration and Probate Act 1928 (19 Geo. V. No. 3632))
	No. 5997	9 October 1956
An Act to apply out of the Consolidated Revenue the sum of Two million six hundred and ninety thousand four hundred and seventy-one pounds to the service of the year One thousand nine hundred and fifty-five and One thousand nine hundred and fifty-six.
Amendments Incorporation Act 1956	No. 5998	16 October 1956
An Act to enable the Incorporation of Amendments to be made in Reprints of amended Acts.
Melbourne Racing Club Act 1956	No. 6000	16 October 1956
An Act to incorporate by the Name of Melbourne Racing Club a certain Voluntary Association formed in Melbourne under the said Name and to vest in the said Corporation certain Real and Personal Property now held on behalf of the said Voluntary Association by the Committee thereof or by Trustees and to provide for the Management of the said Corporation, and for other purposes.
Constitution Act Amendment Act 1956	No. 6006	23 October 1956
An Act to consolidate the Law relating to the Amendment of the Constitution.
Ballaarat Gas Company's Act 1956 (repealed)	No. 6008	23 October 1956
An Act to further amend The Ballaarat Gas Company's Act 1857. (Note: Ballaarat Gas Company's Act 1857 (21 Vict. No. 27)) (Repealed by Statute Law Revision Act 1995 (No. 11 of 1995))
Registrar-General's Fees Act 1956 (repealed)	No. 6012	30 October 1956
An Act relating to Fees payable in the Office of the Registrar-General, and for other purposes. (Repealed by Statute Law Revision Act 1995 (No. 11 of 1995))
National Art Gallery and Cultural Centre Act 1956	No. 6025	7 November 1956
An Act to provide for the Appointment of a National Art Gallery and Cultural Centre Building Committee, for the Establishment of a National Art Gallery and Cultural Centre Trust Fund, to make further Provision for the Site for such Centre, and for other purposes.
Youth Organizations Assistance Act 1956	No. 6026	7 November 1956
An Act to provide for the Appointment of a Youth Organizations Assistance Committee for the Promotion and Assistance of Youth Clubs and other Organizations, and for other purposes.
Appleton Dock Railway Construction Act 1956 (repealed)	No. 6027	7 November 1956
An Act to authorize the Victorian Railways Commissioners to construct a Line of Railway connecting the Commissioners' Terminal System at Dynon with certain Sidings belonging to the Melbourne Harbor Trust Commissioners at and near Appleton Dock. (Repealed by Transport Act 1983 (No. 9921))
Railways (Malvern Subways) Act 1956 (repealed)	No. 6033	7 November 1956
An Act to provide for the Abolition of certain Level Crossings over a Railway in the City of Malvern and to authorize the Construction of Pedestrian Subways under such Railway. (Repealed by Transport Act 1983 (No. 9921))
Public Works Loan Application Act 1956 (repealed)	No. 6049	13 November 1956
An Act to sanction the Issue and Application of Loan Money for Public Works and other Purposes. (Repealed by Treasury Legislation (Repeal) Act 2005 (No. 73 of 2005))
	No. 6055	13 November 1956
An Act to apply a sum out of the Consolidated Revenue to the service of the year ending on the thirtieth day of June One thousand nine hundred and fifty-seven and to appropriate the Supplies granted in this Session of Parliament.
Governor's Salary Act 1956	No. 6056	27 December 1956 (Note: This act was reserved for approval by Her Majesty.)
An Act to amend Section Ten of The Constitution Act Amendment Act 1956. (Note: Constitution Act Amendment Act 1956 (No. 6006))
Boilers Inspection (Amendment) Act 1956	No.	
Cancer Institute (Loan Moneys) Act 1956	No.	
Children's Court Act 1956	No.	
Co-operative Housing Societies (Guarantees and Indemnities) Act 1956	No.	
Companies (Unit Trusts) Act 1956	No.	
Country Fire Authority (Borrowing) Act 1956	No.	
Country Roads Act 1956	No.	
Education (Kindergarten Teachers) Act 1956	No.	
Electoral Act 1956	No.	
Entertainments Tax (Rates) Act 1956	No.	
Estate Agents Act 1956	No.	
Firearms (Industrial Tools) Act 1956	No.	
Forests (Masonite Agreement) Act 1956	No.	
Game (Destruction) Act 1956	No.	
Gas and Fuel Corporation (Acquisition) Act 1956	No.	
Gas and Fuel Corporation (Castlemaine Undertaking) Act 1956	No.	
Gas and Fuel Corporation (Frankston and Dandenong Undertakings) Act 1956	No.	
Gas Regulation (Amendment) Act 1956	No.	
Grain Elevators (Financial) Act 1956	No.	
Health (Narcotics) Act 1956	No.	
Health Act 1956	No.	
Home Finance Act 1956	No.	
Hospital and Charities (Liability of Patients) Act 1956	No.	
Hospital Benefits (Amendment) Act 1956	No.	
Housing (Broadmeadows Land) Act 1956	No.	
Housing (Land) Act 1956	No.	
Housing (Slum Research Officer) Act 1956	No.	
Housing (Staff) Act 1956	No.	
Instruments (Amendment) Act 1956	No.	
Judges Salaries and Allowances Act 1956	No.	
Juries Act 1956	No.	
Keilor (Unimproved Rating Poll) Act 1956	No.	
Labour and Industry (Long Service Leave) Act 1956	No.	
Labour and Industry (Wage Boards) Act 1956	No.	
Land (Improvement Purchase Lease) Act 1956	No.	
Land (Unused Roads) Act 1956	No.	
Land Tax (Rates) Act 1956	No.	
Limitation of Actions (Extension) Act 1956	No.	
Local Authorities Superannuation Act 1956	No.	
Local Government (Amendment) Act 1956	No.	
Local Government (Broadmeadows) Act 1956	No.	
Local Government (Building Regulations) Act 1956	No.	
Marriage (Property) Act 1956	No.	
Medical (Registration) Act 1956	No.	
Melbourne and Metropolitan Board of Works (Borrowing Powers) Act 1956	No.	
Melbourne and Metropolitan Board of Works Act 1956	No.	
Melbourne Harbor Trust (Amendment) Act 1956	No.	
Melbourne Subways (Borrowing) Act 1956	No.	
Motor Car (Driving Licences) Act 1956	No.	
Motor Car (Fees) Act 1956	No.	
Motor Car (Registration Fees) Act 1956	No.	
Motor Car (Third-Party Insurance) Act 1956	No.	
National Parks Act 1956	No.	
Nurses Act 1956	No.	
Parliamentary Contributory Retirement Fund (Amendment) Act 1956	No.	
Penal Reform Act 1956	No.	
Police Offences (Amendment) Act 1956	No.	
Police Offences (Control of Raffles) Act 1956	No.	
Police Offences (Cruelty to Animals) Act 1956	No.	
Police Offences (Trespass to Farms) Act 1956	No.	
Police Pensions Fund (Investment) Act 1956	No.	
Police Regulation (Reservists) Act 1956	No.	
Police Regulation (Retirement) Act 1956	No.	
Portland Harbor Trust (Borrowing Powers) Act 1956	No.	
Portland Harbor Trust (Land) Act 1956	No.	
Process Servers and Inquiry Agents Act 1956	No.	
Racing (Finance) Act 1956	No.	
Railway Loan Application Act 1956	No.	
Railways (Commissioners) Act 1956	No.	
Revenue Deficit Funding Act 1956	No.	
Road Traffic Act 1956	No.	
Rural Finance Corporation (Amendment) Act 1956	No.	
Sheep (Foot Rot) Act 1956	No.	
Soldier Settlement (Amendment) Act 1956	No.	
Stamps (Amendment) Act 1956	No.	
Stamps (Cheques and Receipts) Act 1956	No.	
Stamps (Hire-Purchase Agreements) Act 1956	No.	
State Electricity Commission Act 1956	No.	
State Forests Loan Application Act 1956	No.	
Subordinate Legislation Committee Act 1956	No.	
Superannuation (Amendment) Act 1956	No.	
Supreme Court (Wards of Court) Act 1956	No.	
Teaching Service (Married Women) Act 1956	No.	
Veterinary Surgeons (Amendment) Act 1956	No.	
Water (Compensation) Act 1956	No.	
Water Supply Loan Application Act 1956	No.	
Workers Compensation (Police) Act 1956	No.	
Workers Compensation (Supplementary Board) Act 1956	No.	

== Sources ==
- "1956 Victorian Historical Acts". AustLII.
