= Gas and Fuel Corporation of Victoria =

The Gas and Fuel Corporation of Victoria (G&FC) was a government-owned monopoly supplier of household gas in Victoria, Australia. It was established by the Gas and Fuel Corporation Act 1950 (?) and took over two of the three main gas utilities in Melbourne – the Metropolitan Gas Company and the Brighton Gas Company. As part of the conversion to natural gas, in 1971 the corporation acquired the Geelong Gas Company, one of only two remaining private gas companies in Victoria at the time. The Ballaarat Gas Company closed at the time. The G&FC was wound up in June 1995.

== Consolidation ==
One of the first tasks of the corporation was the construction of a centralised brown coal fuelled gasification plant at Morwell. The Lurgi Gasification Plant opened in Morwell in 1956, which used the German Lurgi process to produce gas, that was transferred to Melbourne via a high pressure gas pipeline. Construction of the Morwell plant led to the closure in 1957 of a number of town gas producing gasworks scattered throughout Melbourne and elsewhere, such as the South Melbourne Gas plant, some of which became gas storage sites.

In 1954, workers at the Lurgi Gasification Plant in Morwell formed the Lurgi Social Club and an adjoined club, Lurgi Rangers SC debuted in the same year. In 1955, they began competing in the Latrobe Valley Soccer League.

The production of Syngas started in the 1950s, which is a process that converted waste gases from oil refineries to a useful energy product. In 1966, 30% of gas was being produced from residual oil, 30% from refinery gas and LPG, 30% from Lurgi gas, and less than 10% by carbonization of black coal.

Natural gas was discovered in Bass Strait by Esso and BHP in 1965. The Longford gas plant acted as the onshore receiving point for oil and natural gas output from production platforms in Bass Strait. By 1969 the production plant and distribution network were complete, allowing natural gas to be sold to consumers, and a natural gas conversion program took place over the next 20 months, ending in December 1970. The conversion to natural gas required the conversion of around one million gas appliances, and resulted in over 1,000 workers becoming redundant. All the gas plants and storage sites in Melbourne and regional centres were closed down and the sites sold.

== Privatisation and winding up ==
In July 1997 the Gas and Fuel Corporation was broken up into three divisions: gas distributor and retail companies, a gas transmission company and an independent market operator, VENCorp. The Kennett Government subsequently privatised the distribution, retail and transmission companies, along with the State Electricity Commission of Victoria, Victoria's main electricity utility. The G&FC was wound up in June 1995 by the Gas and Fuel Corporation (Repeal) Act 1995 (No. 31 of 1995). Gascor acted as a gas wholesaler, purchasing gas from Esso/BHP and on-selling it to private sector gas retailers Origin Energy, AGL and TXU.

The corporation's headquarters, the Princes Gate Towers on Flinders Street, built in 1967, were demolished in 1997 to make way for the Federation Square development.
