= Geelong Gas Company =

Former gas company in Australia

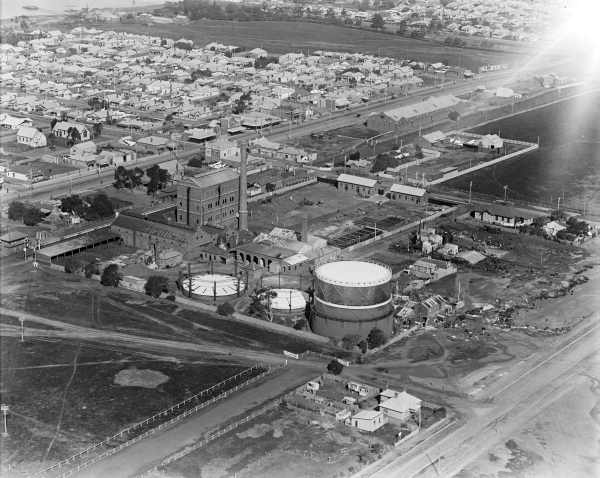
Overview of the North Geelong gasworks in 1926

The Geelong Gas Company was a private company set up to produce and distribute town gas in the city of Geelong. From a gasworks in North Geelong it converted coal into town gas for use in homes and industry. The company was founded in 1858 and existed until 1971 when Geelong was converted to natural gas and the company was bought out by the Gas and Fuel Corporation of Victoria.

== Establishment ==
The first attempts at establishing a reticulated gas supply in Geelong were made in 1854. However, it was not until July 1857 that a meeting was held at the National Hotel to establish a gas company in Geelong. The first official meeting was held on 20 August 1857.

The company was established on 4 June 1858 by the Geelong Gas Company's Act 1858 (21 Vict. No. 57) "to promote the convenience of the inhabitants of the Town of Geelong and the municipal district of Newtown and Chilwell."

The company planned to build a plant capable of producing 25 million cubic feet (710,000 m^{3}) of gas a year. To distribute this gas to customers, 11 miles (18 km) of gas mains was planned, made of 12-inch (300 mm) to 2-inch (51 mm) pipes.

April 1858 saw the company start its search for land to erect the gasworks on. The first site chosen was in central Geelong. bounded by Bellarine Street, Corio Bay, Corio Street and Corio Terrace (now Brougham Street). This site was rejected by nearby homeowners, as well as government representative, MLC MJ Strachan, due to health issues having the plant in the city. The Geelong Gas Company's Act 1858 prohibited gas production in the Corporation of Geelong leaving the company to find another site.

Land on the western side of the railway station at North Geelong was purchased from the Geelong and Melbourne Railway Company for the gasworks. The sale was accepted in March 1859, for £200 an acre, for a total of 6 acres (24,000 m^{2}). A railway siding for the gasworks was provided in September 1859, and was the first private siding in the area.

On 10 February 1860 the foundation stone was laid. A time capsule was also laid with newspapers, coins, a copy of the constitution of company, and a list of those involved with the gasworks construction. This capsule was recovered in 1924 and presented to the company. The original cost of the scheme was not exceed £25,000. The final price was £24,135.

The first gas lamp connected to the system was tested on 3 May 1860. Three weeks later on 24 May there was an official event marking the first gas lamp in Geelong.

== Expansion ==
In the first year of operation for the company, a ten per cent dividend was paid to shareholders from profits. By 1894 13 per cent of business and street lighting in Geelong was gas powered. In the City of Geelong there were 263 street gas lamps, in the City of Newtown and Chilwell there were 48, in the City of Geelong West there were 45, and there was a single lamp in the Shire of South Barwon. The street lights used gave the equivalent light of 15 sperm candles for each 5 cubic feet (0.14 m^{3}) of gas burnt. However, by 1913 most of the major street lighting contracts had been lost to electricity.

By the end of World War I capacity at the gasworks was stretched, so in 1924 the works were rebuilt with new technology. 1925 was the first industrial use of gas, before this time it was primarily used in households. The company built new offices at 161 Ryrie Street in 1920.

In 1957 the No. 5 gas holder was erected in Riversdale Road, Newtown at a cost of £110,000 to serve proposed gas main extensions south of Barwon River. By 1958 the company had 18,000 customers and 180 miles (290 km) of gas mains throughout Geelong. In 1963 it had grown to 250 miles (400 km) of gas mains, 46 per cent being less than 10 years old, and 30 per cent less than 5 years old. A new gas holder of 1 million cubic feet (28,000 m^{3}) capacity was also commissioned during 1964, built by the Power-Gas Corporation (Australia) Pty Ltd.

== Obsolescence ==
By the 1960s production of gas from coal was an obsolete technology. By 1963 the Geelong Gas Company had changed production methods, using an Onia Gegi (Note: The Onia-Gegi process was a gasification process developed by the French ‘Office National Industriel de l’Azote’ in co-operation with the ‘Gaz à l’Eau et Gaz Industriels’, hence the name Onia-Gegi. Originally developed for the production of synthesis gas, it was later used to produce town gas. (Synthesis gas consists primarily of hydrogen and carbon monoxide, and is used to produce ammonia and methanol.) The Onia-Gegi plant was designed to produce a gas similar to town gas with a CV of 18.6 MJ/m3 (500 Btu/ft3), using a nickel catalyst. The system operated at atmospheric pressure and at 900°C to promote reaction by the nickel catalyst with steam, carbon and hydrocarbons. This produced a higher gas content and a lower tar/carbon yield than the Jones system. The Onia-Gegi system produced similar amounts of tar to the SEGAS process under the same conditions.) reforming plant to convert hydrocarbon gases from the Shell oil refinery at Corio into town gas. The new reforming plant was visited by many other gas companies as an example of modern Syngas technology. The former coal carbonising equipment was only used when coke (a by-product of the gasification process) was required.

The discovery of abundant reserves of natural gas in Bass Strait shook up town gas production. On 16 March 1967 a letter of intent was signed by the Geelong Gas Company with the Esso Australia and Hematite Petroleum to buy natural gas from their Bass Strait gas fields for a 20-year period.

The cost of conversion of the Geelong system to natural gas was estimated at $2.5 to $3 million, with a likely completion date of 1971. The conversion entailed building a new pipeline from Melbourne, purging the old gas from the mains, change over of all burners in all gas appliances, changes to valves in the distribution network to permit the higher pressures, and removal of the now-unneeded gasworks.

The main natural gas pipeline between Geelong and Melbourne was finished in February 1971. Costing $1.7 million, the pipeline was designed to operate at a maximum pressure of 1000psi, and carry 60 million cubic feet (1,700,000 m^{3}) of gas a day. Conversion of homes to natural gas commenced on 15 March 1971, starting at suburbs furthermost from the gasworks, and was completed by the end of August 1971.

== The end ==
A takeover bid for the Geelong Gas Company was issued on 11 December 1964 when the company was served with a notice of acquisition by the Gas and Fuel Corporation of Victoria. At this time the 20 shilling ($2) shares in the company were valued at one pound, 16 shillings and sixpence ($3.65), with a total of about 800 shareholders in the company. The takeover bid was later withdrawn.

A takeover bid by the Gas and Fuel Corporation was made in 1970 when a bill was passed in the state parliament, with shareholders offered $3.40 a share. The takeover was ratified when 70% of shareholders accepted the offer, and the Geelong Gas Company ceased to exist on 30 June 1971.

There was some controversy over the takeover, with it being revealed that a senior accountant with the Gas and Fuel Corporation had bought 11,000 shares in the Geelong Gas Company shortly before the takeover was made public. It was proved that the accountant had used insider knowledge to buy the shares, but the state government was told no action could be taken. The issue remained alive until late 1971 when then Opposition Leader Clyde Holding called for a further investigation. This move was quashed by Premier Henry Bolte on the advice of the Victorian Auditor General.

The gasworks themselves were demolished in September 1972, but the railway siding and the concrete foundations of a gas holder are still visible on the site today. The company offices at 161 Ryrie Street are now listed on the Victorian Heritage Register.
