= Forest Hill Chase =

Shopping centre in Forest Hill, Victoria

Coordinates: 37.8354°S 145.1625°E

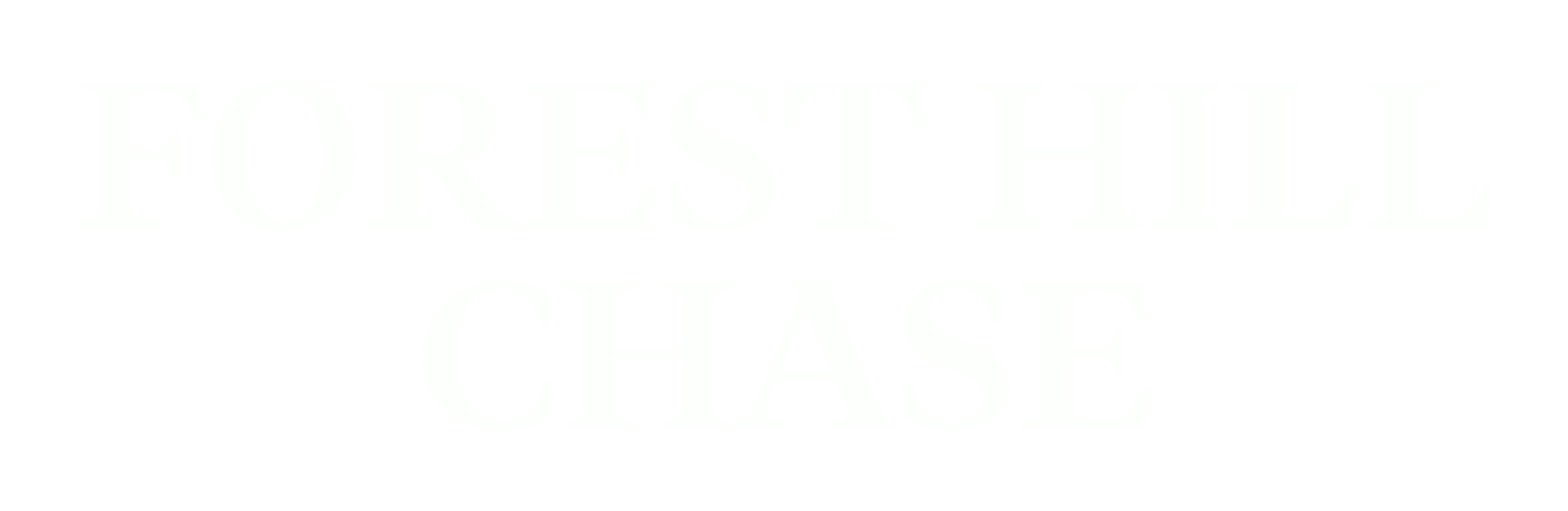
- Location: Forest Hill, Victoria, Australia
- Address: 270 Canterbury Road
- Opened: 30 June 1964; 62 years ago
- Demolished: 1987 (Original centre)
- Previous names: Forest Hills (1964–70); Forest Hill S. C. (1970–89)
- Developer: Paul Fayman; Maurice Alter; George Herscu
- Manager: Haben (since 2022)
- Owner: Masaga Holdings (1964–1980); Pacific Group (1980–2004); Novion (2004–2015); Blackstone (2015–2022); JY Group (2022–); Haben (2022–)
- Architect: Bill Wheatland (1956–58); Leslie M. Perrott & Ptns (1959–60); Thord Lorich (1964–69); Ernest Fooks (1973–79); Meldrum, Burrows & Ptns (1980–85); Buchan, Laird & Bawden (1985–92); Peddle Thorp (2012) i2C Architects (2018); NH Architects (2024–25)
- Num. of stores: 203
- Num. of anchor tenants: 7 major 10 minor
- Floor area: 63,851 m^{2} (687,290 sq ft)
- Floors: 3
- Parking: 3427
- Website: www.foresthillchase.com.au

Forest Hill Chase (often called "The Chase" is a major regional shopping centre located in Forest Hill, a suburb of Melbourne, Australia. It has approximately 200 shops across three levels and parking space for over 3400 cars. It has three supermarkets (Coles, Woolworths, Aldi), two discount department stores (Target and Harris Scarfe), a Hoyts cinema complex and some smaller anchor stores.

First proposed in 1957, the centre officially was officially opened in 1964 by Masaga Holdings and underwent significant redevelopments completed in July 1976 and December 1990. It was originally known as the Forest Hill(s) Shopping Centre, reopening as Forest Hill Chase in 1989.

== Early development ==
=== Preliminary planning ===
In the mid-1950s, Polish-born property developer and abattoir operator Paul Fayman bought a poultry farm at Canterbury Road, intending to establish a landmark retail destination for Melbourne's booming eastern suburbs. The idea followed the Myer family's purchase of land in Burwood East for an American-style regional shopping centre, a concept then new to Victoria. Fayman, who was a survivor of the German concentration camps, had only recently settled in Melbourne and co-owned the Esplanade Hotel. He was well-connected in Melbourne's Jewish business circles, forming friendships with lawyers Maurice Slonim and Leon Velik, who become partners in the venture.

Promotional brochure from 1958.

Fayman met the original architect (Bill Wheatland) and the engineer (Walter McLaughlan) through their shared interest in horse racing. McLauglan was also property manager and spokesperson for the proposal during its early years. He secured major tenants Woolworths, Paynes Bon Marche, Shell and McEwans who entered into contracts with the developers during the early months of 1957.

Plans were first publicly confirmed in July 1957, announcing the proposed centre would feature about seventy shops, two service stations, a housing estate, public open space, and parking for over a thousand cars.

The developers envisioned as an “almost complete town”. Its proximity to Myer’s proposed Burwood East centre is cited as being a factor in Myer redirecting its focus to Melbourne’s south-east, leading to the development of Chadstone, which later became Australia’s largest shopping centre. Directors and consultants made several study trips to the United States to survey the newest generation of American regional malls.

They visited the Stonestown Galleria in San Francisco, one of the most influential post-war malls in America, whose layout would directly inform the design of the Forest Hill centre. There was a long debate between the developers, local council and neighbours about what the centre should be called. During the early planning stage it was referred to as either the Forest Hill or Forest Hills shopping centre.

The 's' at the end of Forest Hills was controversial as it didn't accurately reflect the suburb of Forest Hill, instead keeping with the American theme and referencing Forest Hills in Queens, NYC. Between 1958 and 1960, it was advertised as the Stonestown Drive-In Shopping Centre, reverting back to Forest Hills in time for opening in 1964.

=== Delays (1957–1964) ===
The proposal was exceptionally ambitious for the time and struggled to gain momentum from the beginning. After its initial announcement, information about the project became subject to continual rumours. In an interview with the Nunawading Gazette, Walter McLaughlan admitted the developers felt they almost owed an apology to local residents, prospective buyers, and business owners. He announced construction would begin in February 1958, which was about 7 months later than originally projected.

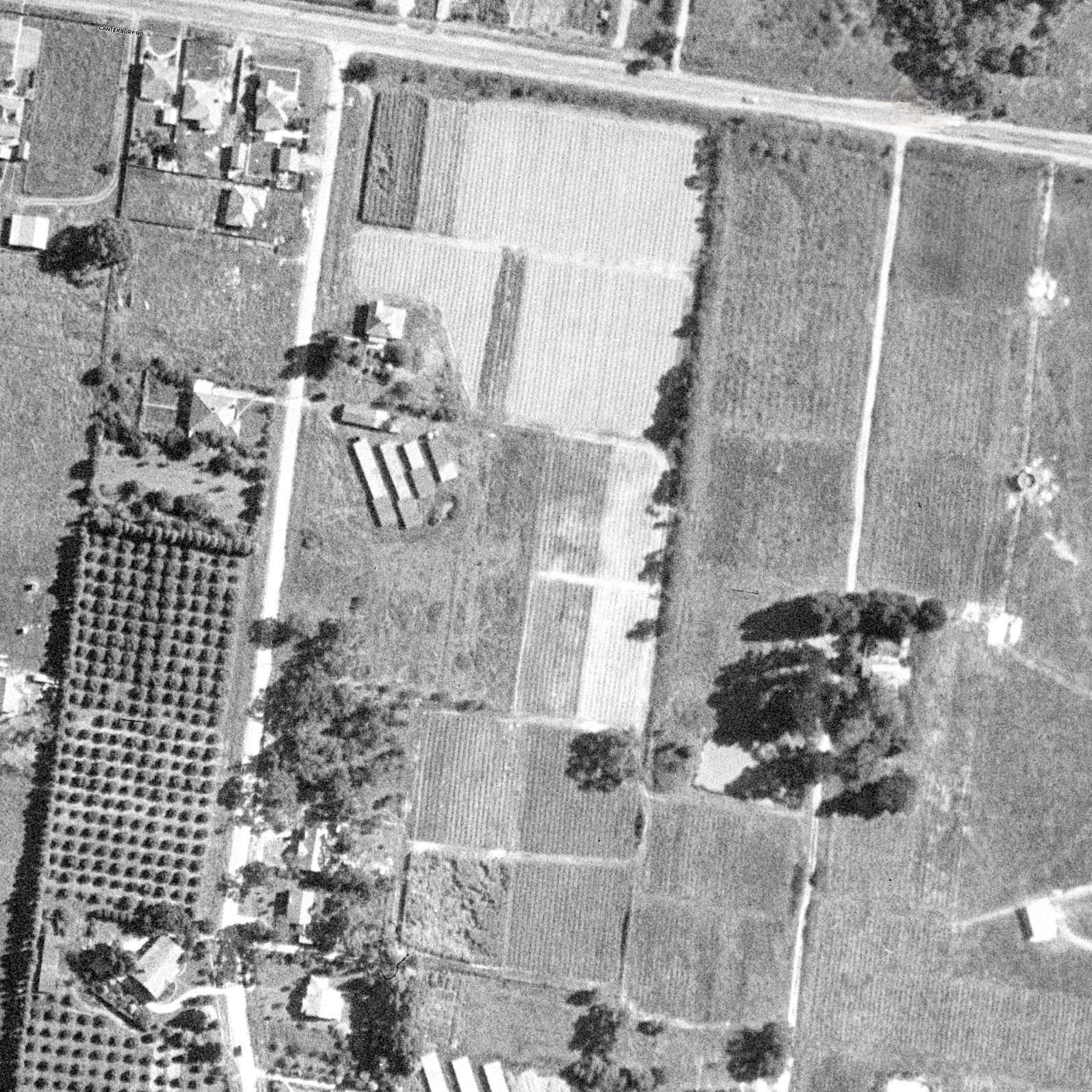
Aerial view (1956)

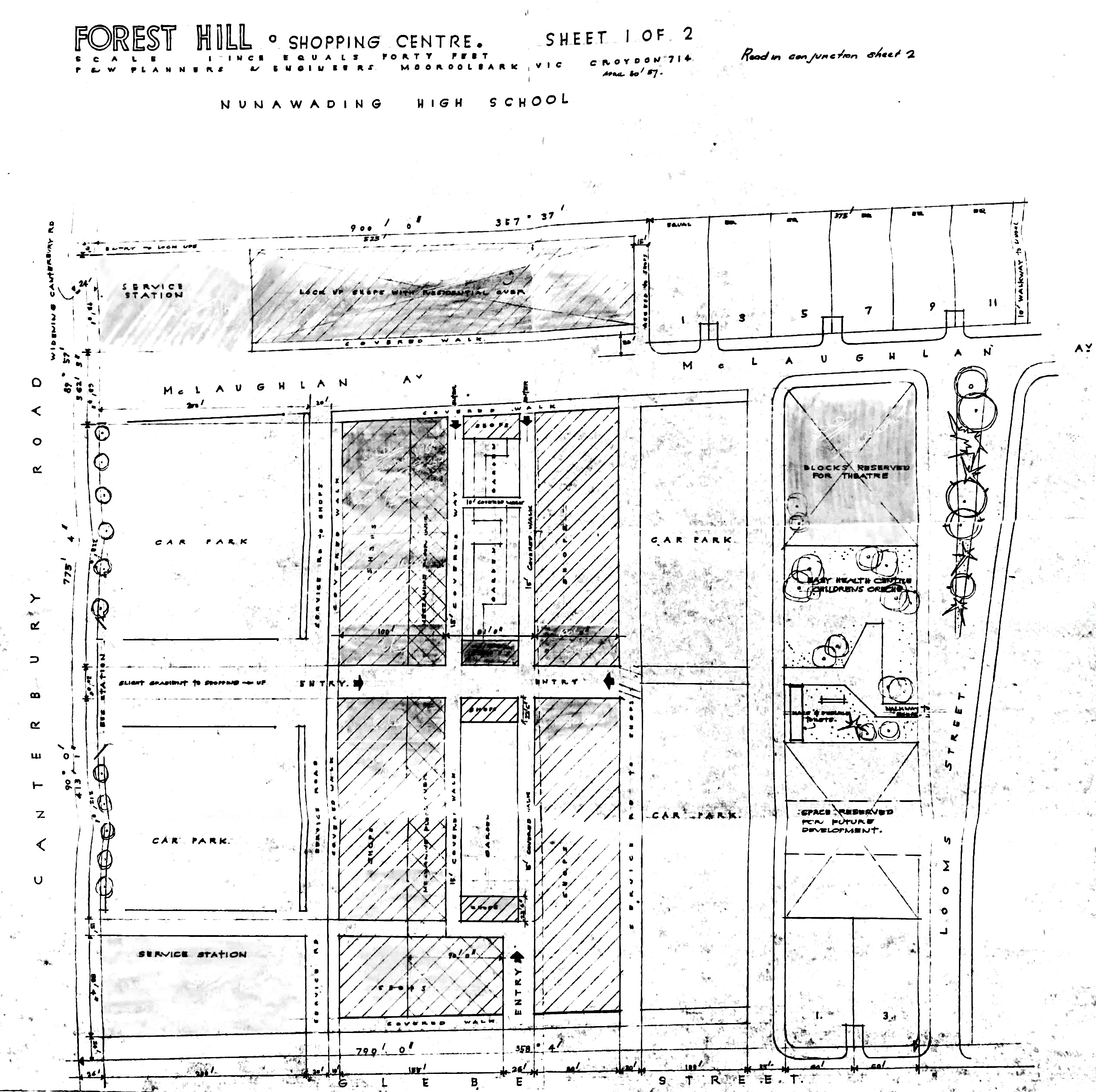
Plan (1957)

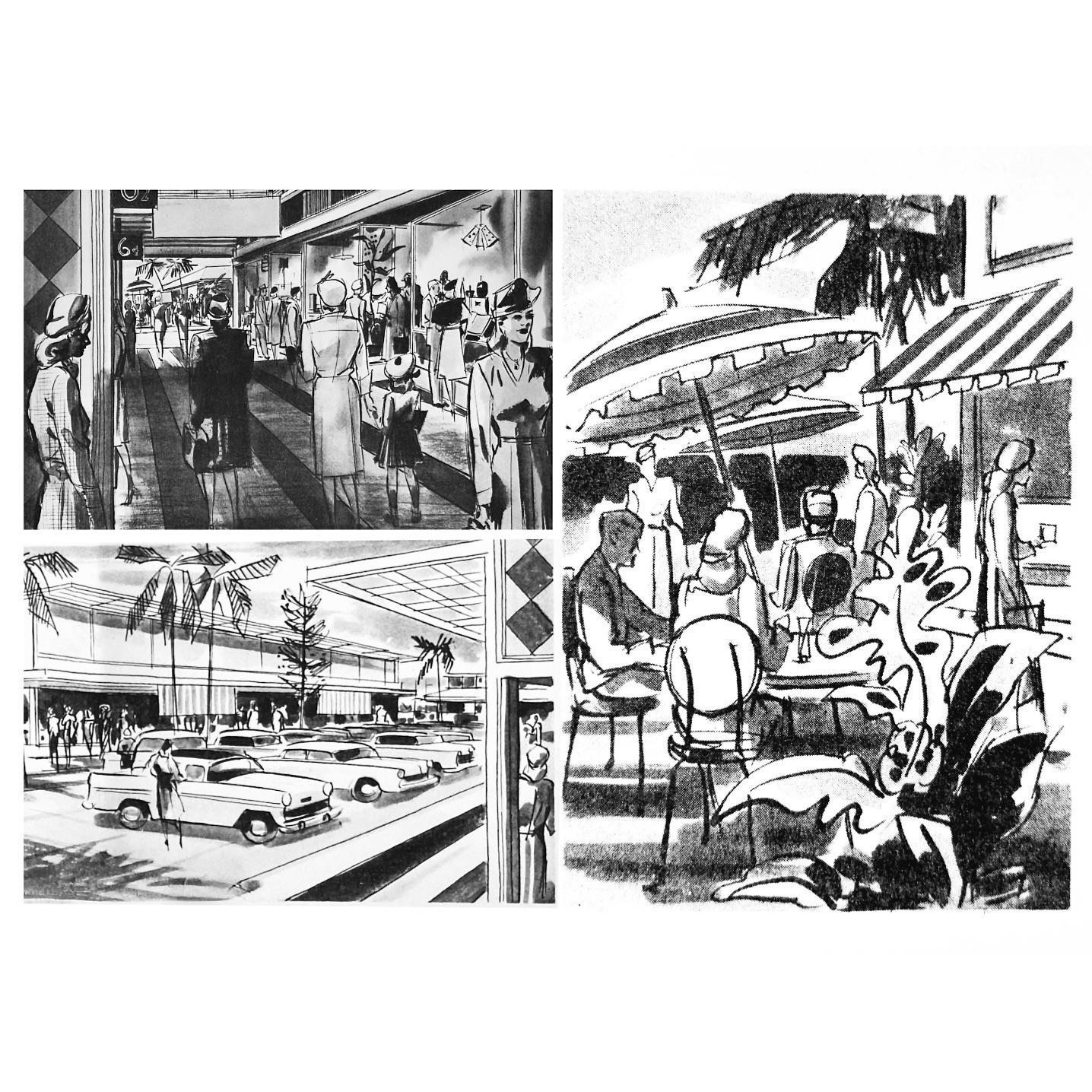
Perspectives (1958)

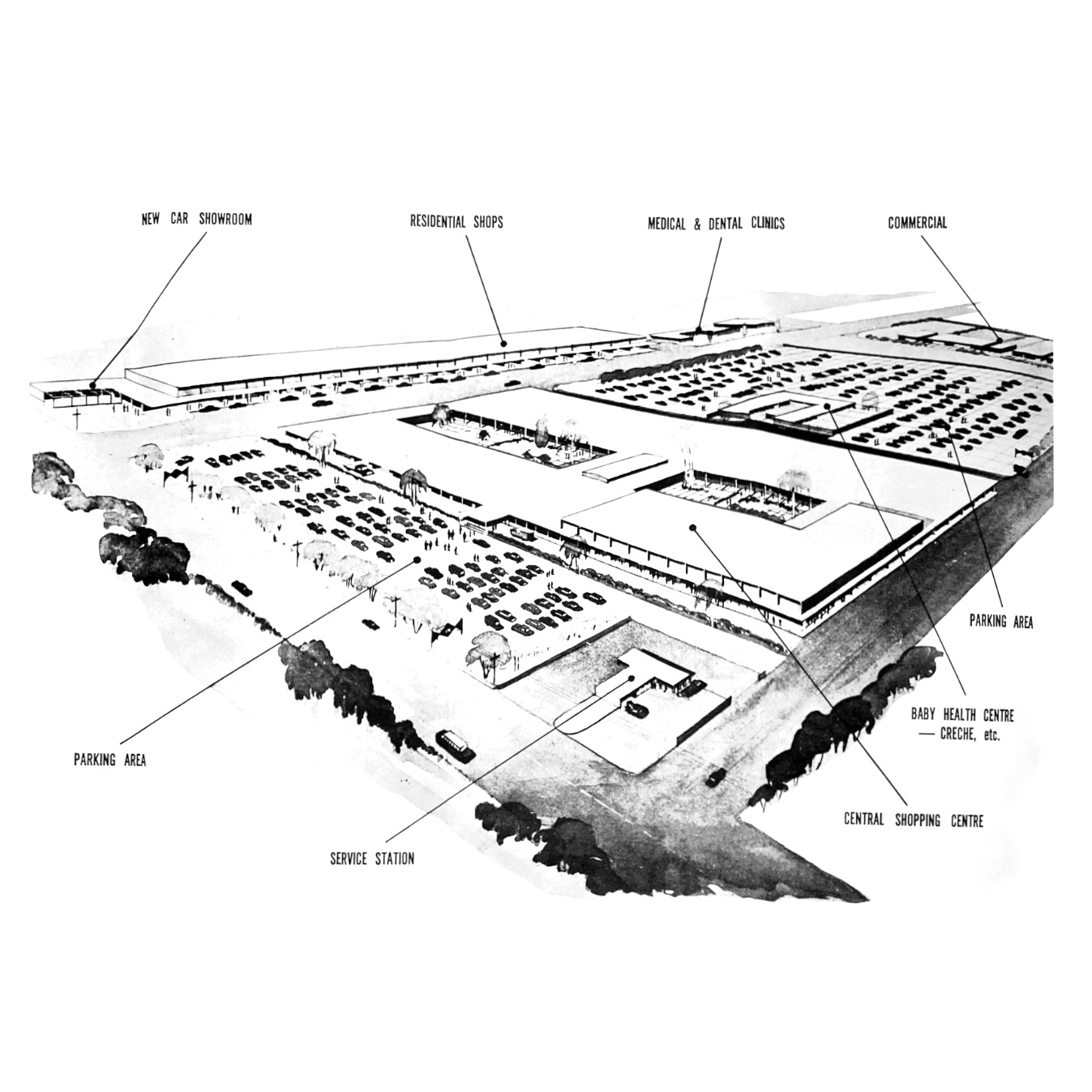
Amenities (1958)

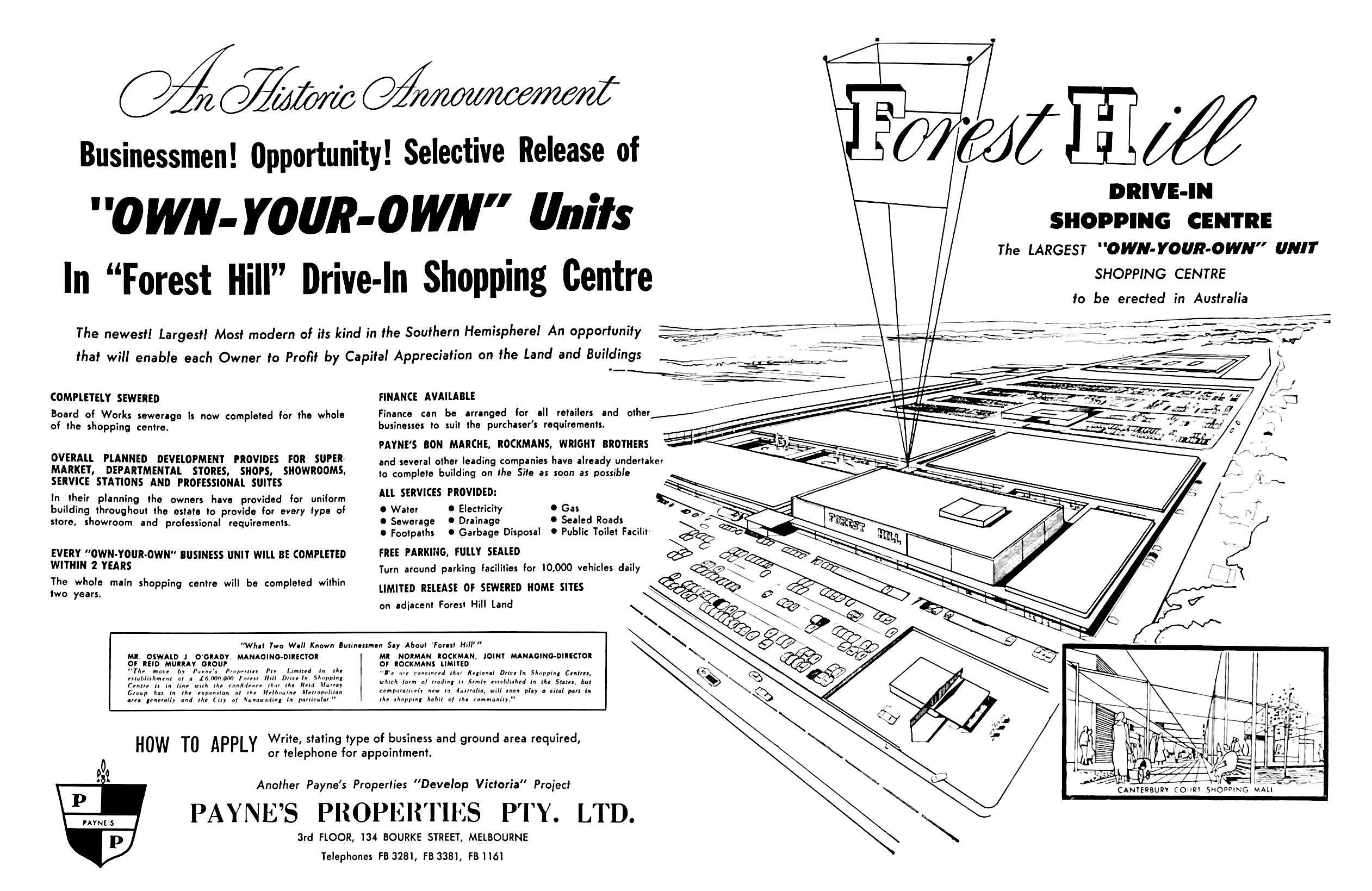
Re-announcement press release by Paynes Properties, May 1959

After over a year of no progress, in March 1958, the developers floated a private consortium company called Forest Hill Heights and began promoting the venture again. Illustrated promotional brochures were widely distributed across worldwide in an attempt to secure investors.Eventually, young entrepreneur Raymond Borg acquired a controlling interest in the development. His company, Paynes Bon Marche, was among the original tenants secured back in early 1957.

Subsequently, the Forest Hill Heights company was privatised. Then it bought an additional 18 hectares of land surrounding the centre, effectively quadrupling the size of the housing estate to about 190 blocks. More than £250,000 was set aside for roads, drainage, and sewerage.

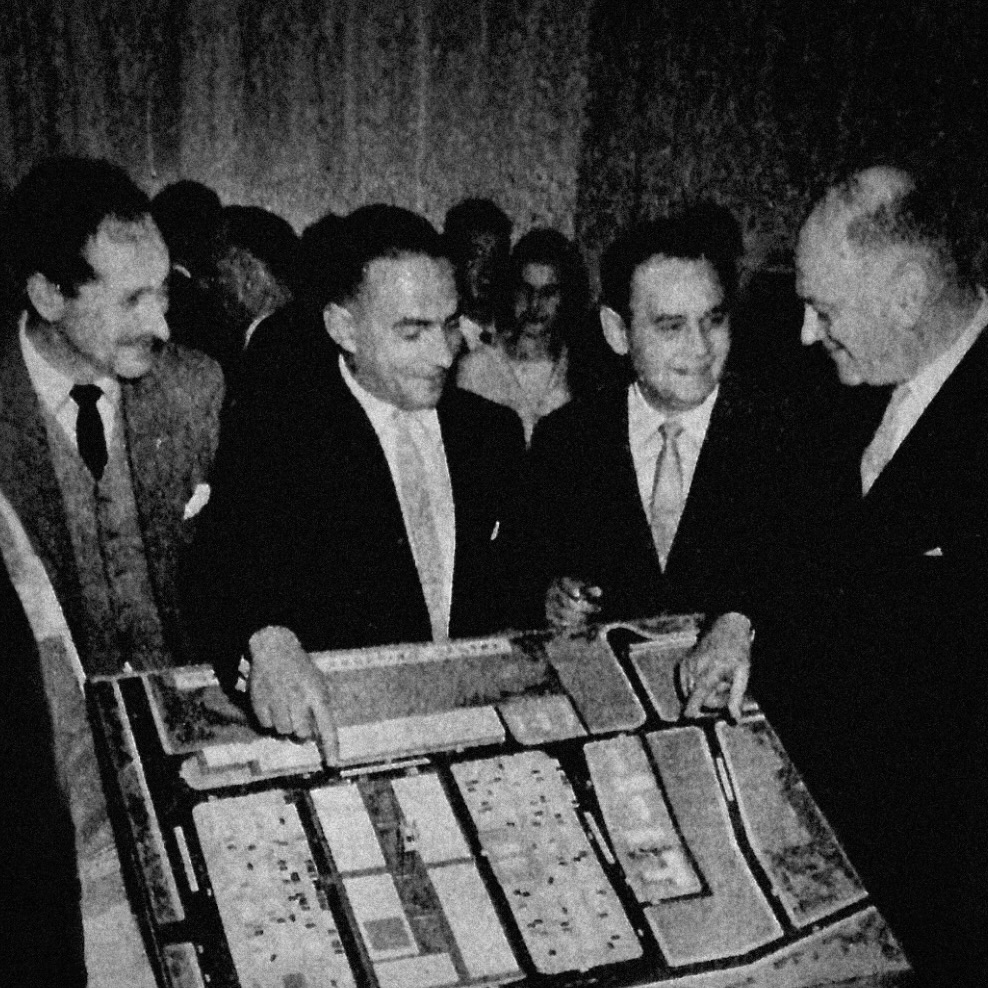
(L-R): Architect Leslie Perrott Jnr., and developers Raymond Borg, Paul Fayman and Joseph Emanuel

All roadworks were contracted to F. J. Kerr & Bros who built several streets including Barter Crescent, Paul Road, and an extension of Mahoneys Road, creating a thoroughfare between Burwood Highway and Canterbury Road. With additional funding secured, prestigious architectural firm Leslie M. Perrott & Partners were hired to expand on and enhance Wheatland's 1957/58 design.

A press conference to officially launch the development was held on 26 May 1959 at the Hotel Australia. In announcing his company's participation in the centre, Norman Rockman of the Rockman's department store chain predicted that "regional drive-in shopping centres will soon play a vital part in the shopping habits of the community". The Rockman's chain, which had recently been acquired by developer Stanley Korman, joined the centre as an anchor tenant.

Representing Payne's Properties and the Reid-Murray group, Raymond Borg said in his speech to the crowd: "My associates and I feel we shall build more than an ultra-modern drive-in shopping centre, planned by far-sighted people." He also said that the centre would be "the largest and most modern in Australia". The next day, HSV-7 aired an interview with the supervising architect Leslie M Perrott Junior, who discussed his American-influenced design.

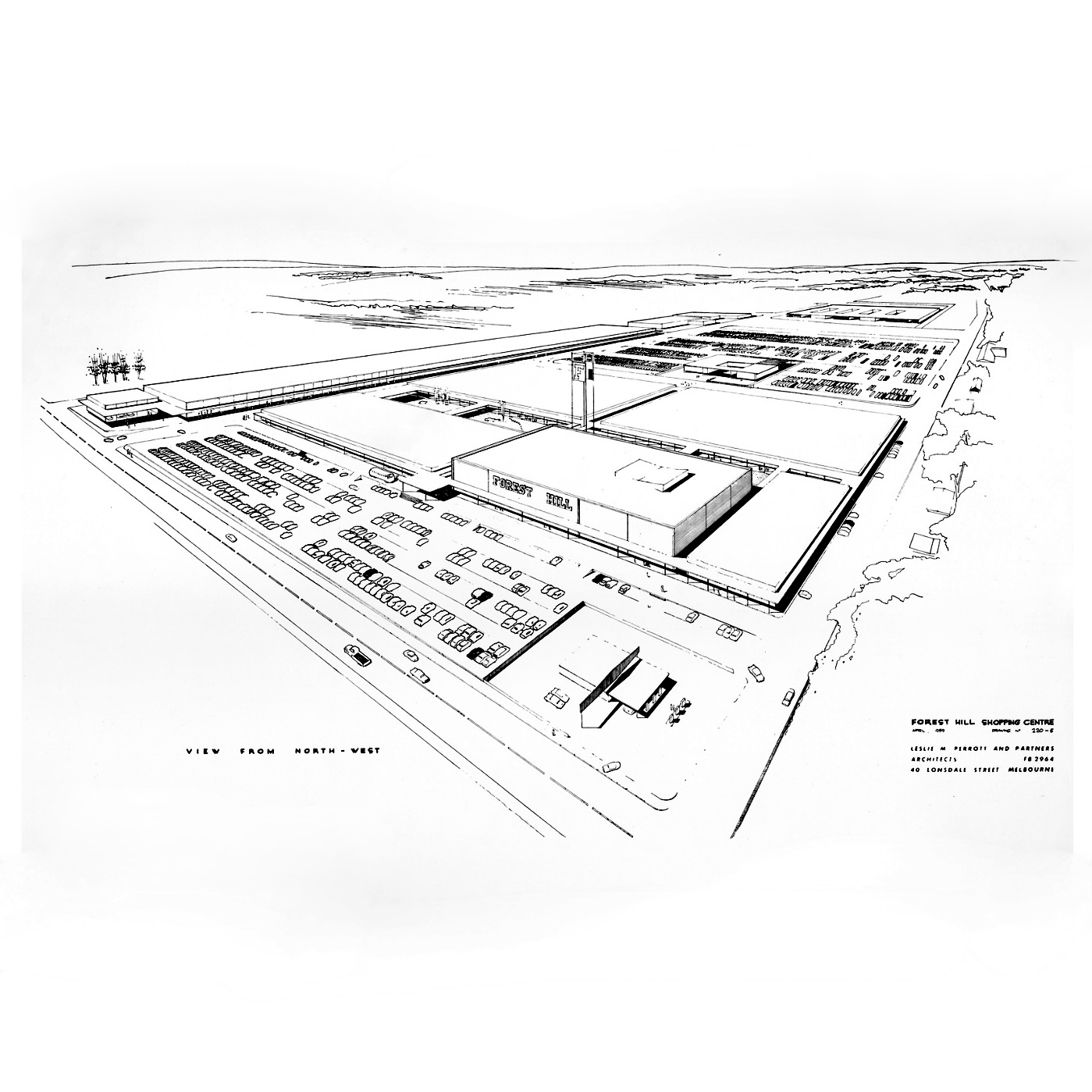
Architect's sketch (1959)

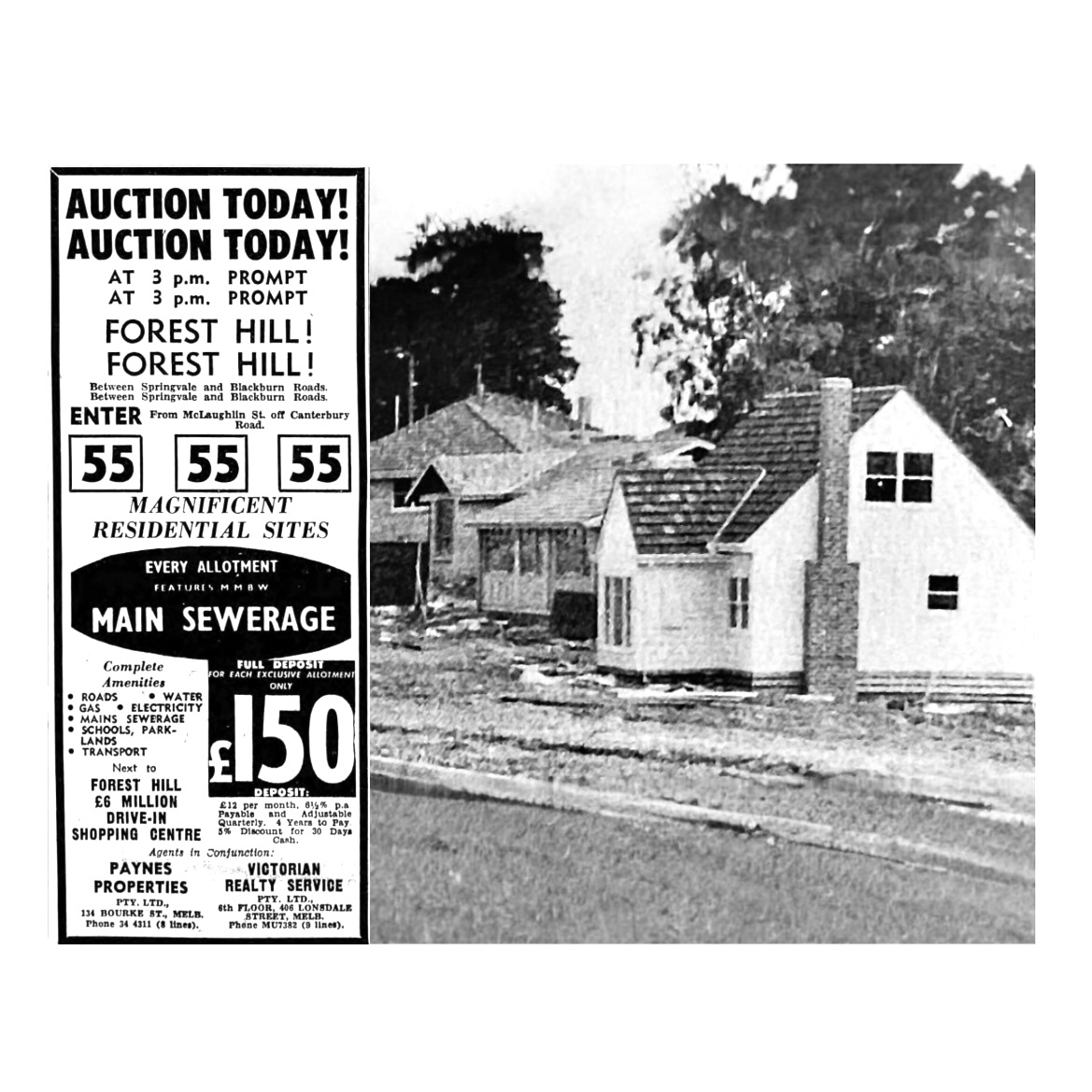
Housing estate (1960)

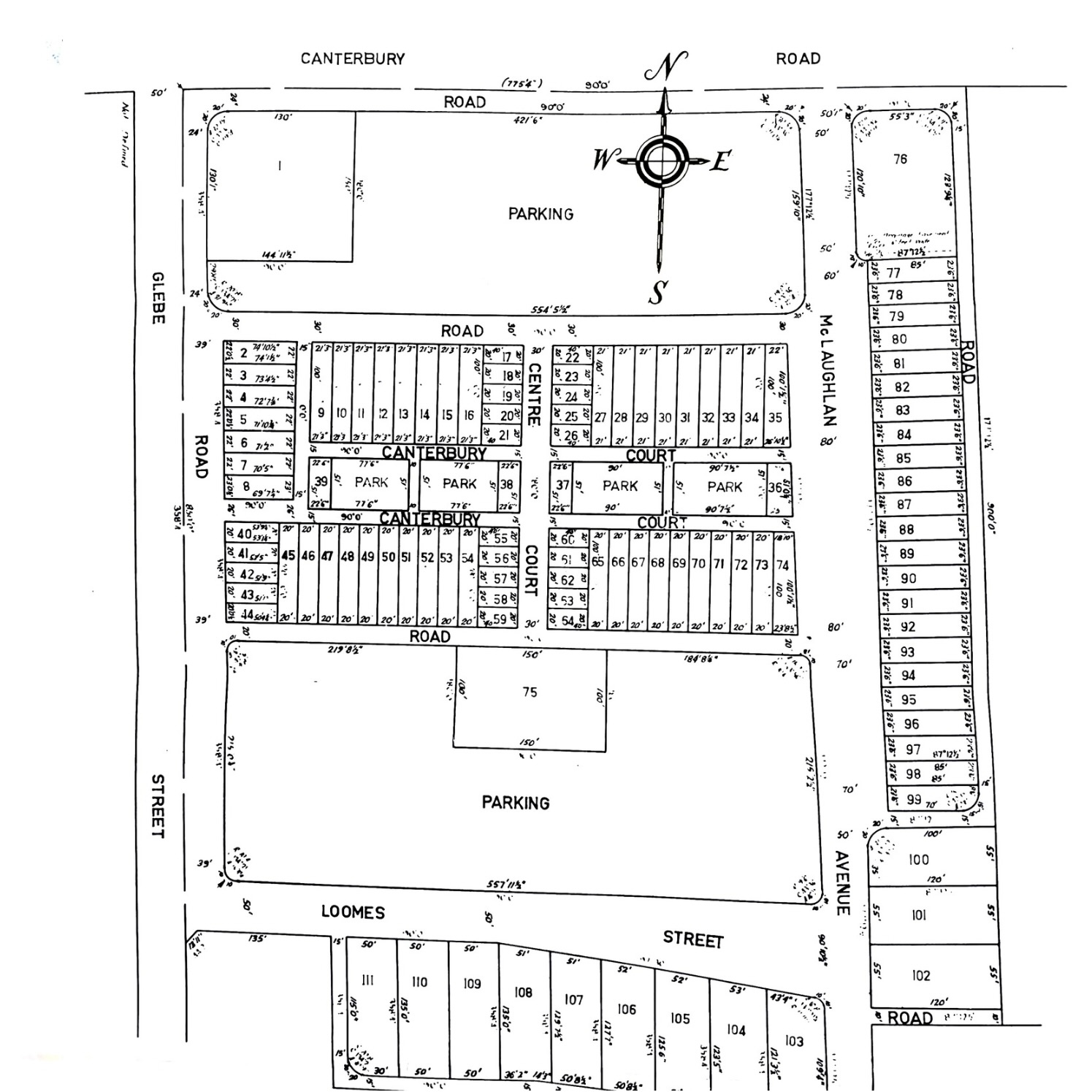
Subdivision plan (1958)

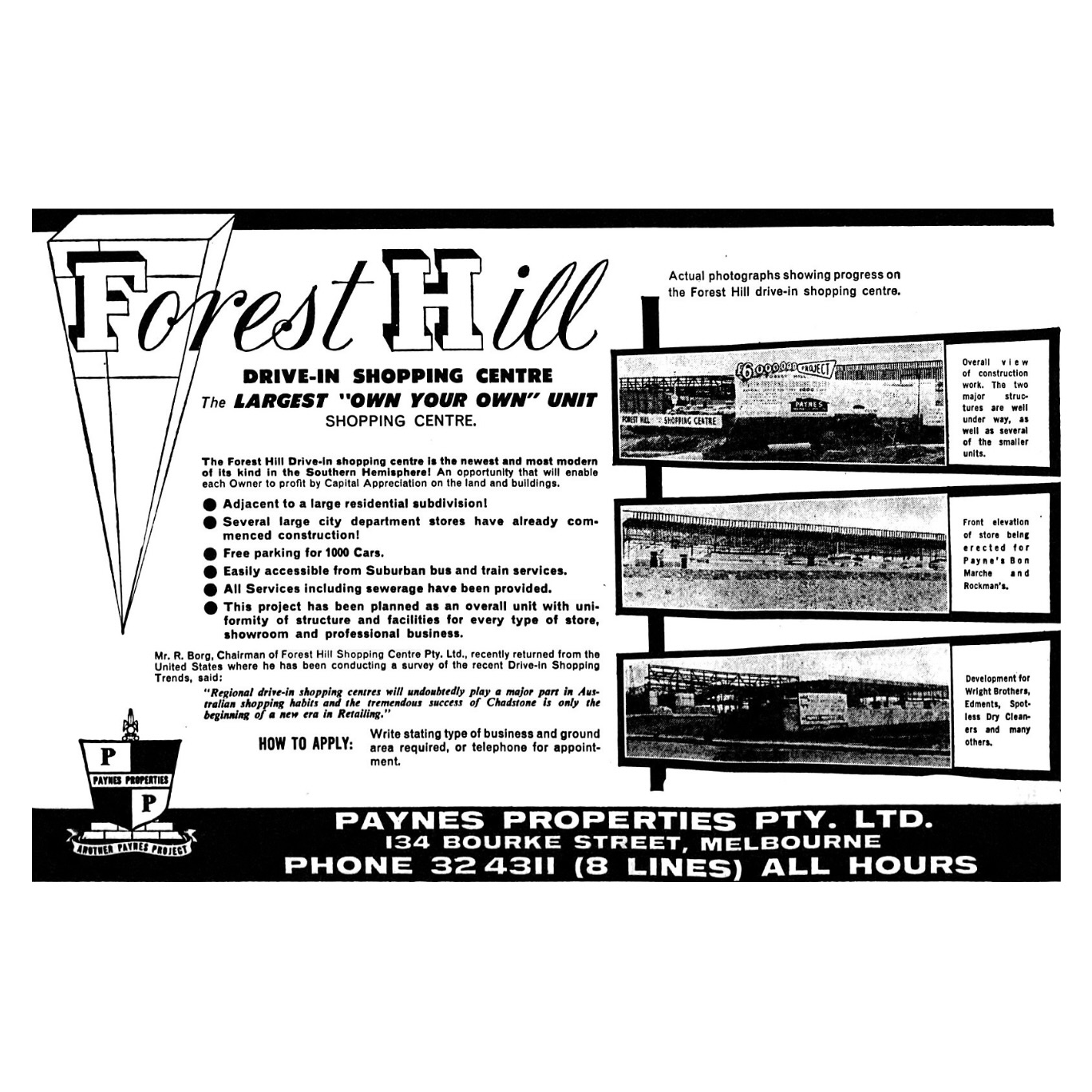
Progress report (1960)

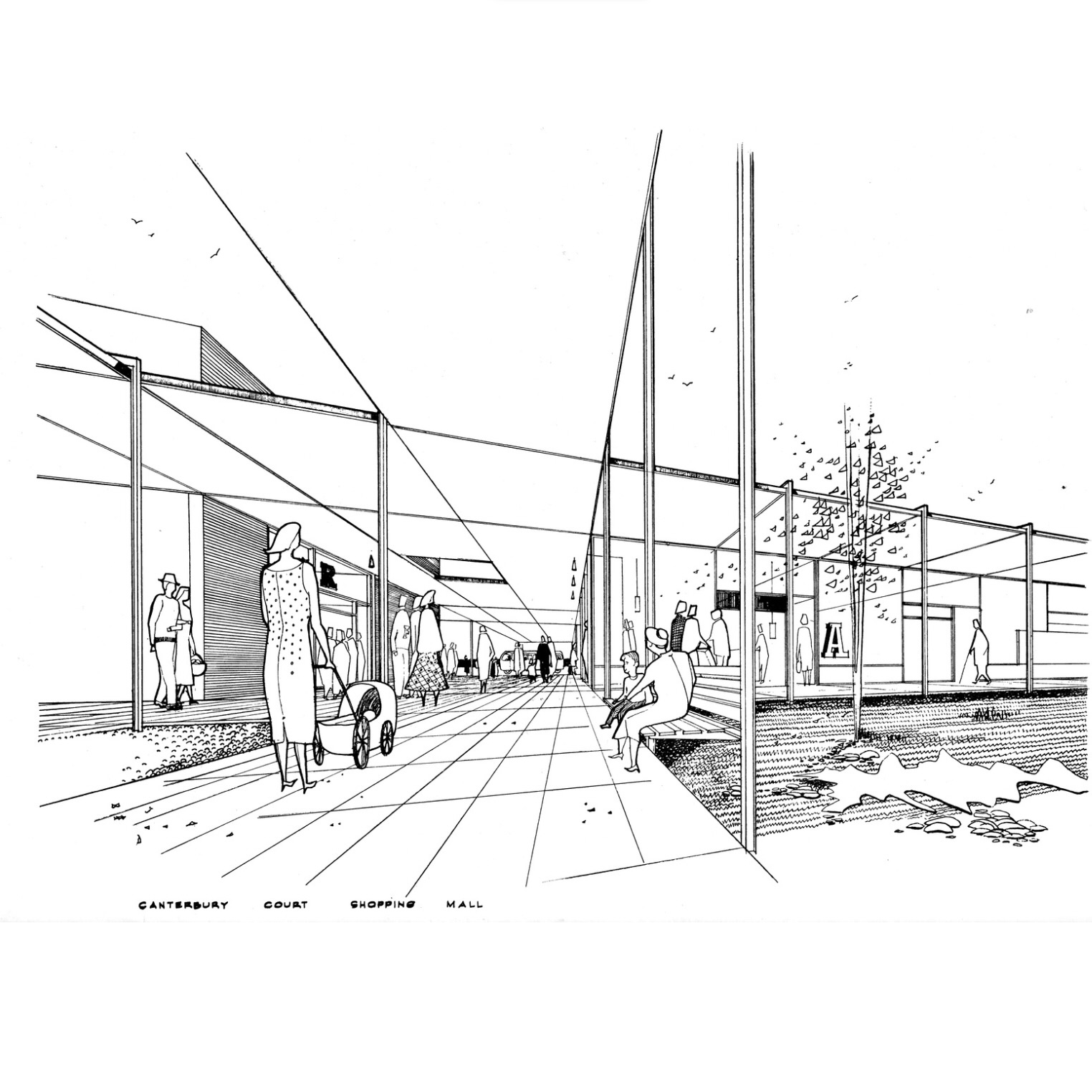
Architect's sketch (1959)

1959 aerial view of roads under construction by contractors F. J. Kerr & Brothers of Ferntree Gully.

Later in the year it was announced that a medical centre had been added to the plans, though this wouldn't be until 1969 under different architects. In preparation for construction of the shops and houses, an orchard of about five hundred trees was bulldozed. Approximately six hectares of thickly-timbered remnant bushland was cleared, and several timber cottages were burnt down under CFA supervision.

Tenders for the centre itself were called once again and works commenced by November 1959. Contractor McDougall-Ireland built three large anchor stores near the car park at Canterbury Road, and a dozen subsidiary shops in the Centre Court. Residential land first went to auction in December 1959, with many lots having homes built by Paynes Properties and sold as a package.

=== Development stops (1960–1964) ===
The developers sought to establish an expensive hotel with the centre, and applied for a liquor license. But this move was strongly opposed by local residents, who stressed road safety issues and the welfare of the students at the adjacent Nunawading High School. The centre's opening was subsequently rescheduled from March 1960 to January 1961, but this was optimistic. After 89 ratepayers and local associations sent written objections to Council, it was agreed by a vote of 9 to 1 that Council should intervene and a public hearing was convened at the Licensing Court.

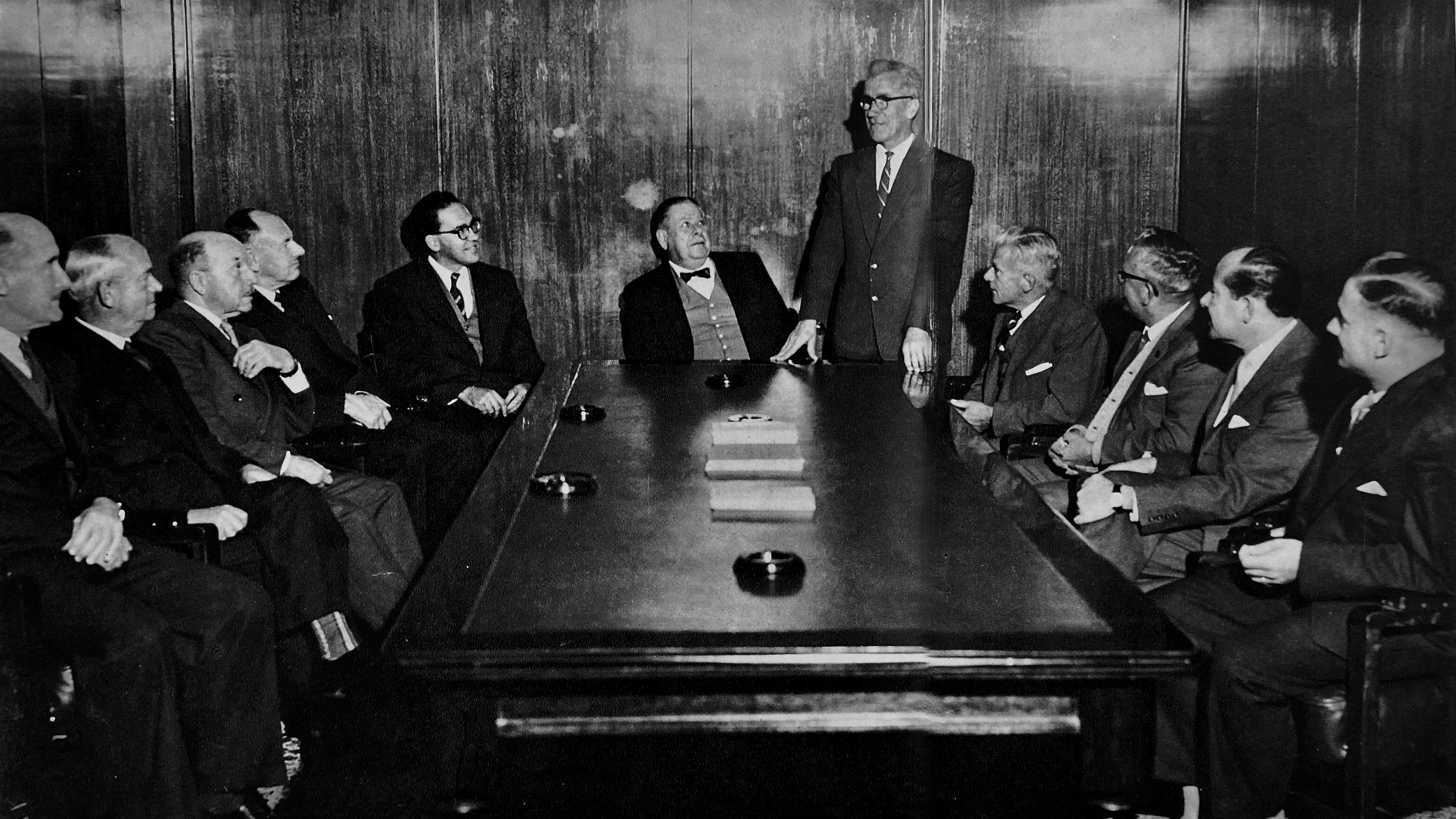
Board of Reid Murray, 1959

1961 aerial view of the half-built centre (middle-right) sitting vacant next to Nunawading High School.

In June 1960, amid protracted disputes and the formation of a protest society, the developers simply dropped the hotel from the plans. By this time, only a dozen or so shops had been built, but would sit empty long past their schedule opening. The delay was mainly due to declining economic conditions and an eventual credit crunch, which lead to the bankruptcy of industrialist Stanley Korman – a key backer of the project.

Both incidents received widespread media coverage, contributing to Payne's parent company, Reid-Murray Holdings, being placed into a receivership amid what became the largest and longest bankruptcy in Australian history. To make matters worse, another key financier, Raymond Borg of Payne's Properties, was under investigation for fraud and later served jail time. Reflecting in his sole biographical interview, Fayman likened the scenery at Forest Hill during this period to "a ghost town". The abandoned parking surfaces became a place for drifting cars. Meanwhile, rival centre Chadstone opened in October 1960 to much fanfare.

=== Development restarts (1964) ===
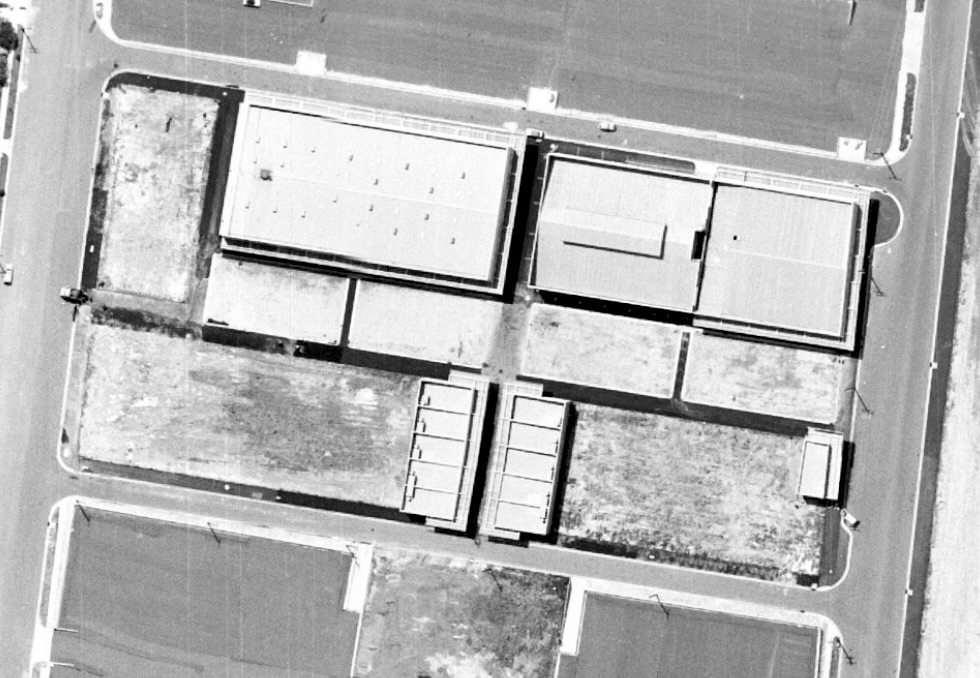
First stage, 1964

In February 1964, the receivers of Reid-Murray Holdings held a shareholder meeting at the South Melbourne Town Hall. Referring to the derelict land at Forest Hill, one shareholder apparently asked if "this monument to stupidity" had been sold. The land fell back into the hands of Fayman shortly after the meeting, compellng him to seek additional investors to get the project going again. As Fayman recalled, he was showing shop builders Maurice Alter and George Herscu around the deserted centre when Herscu blurted out: "Why just buy the shops? I want to buy the whole centre".

Alter and Herscu subsequently acquired a joint controlling interest in the development, while Fayman & associates retained about a quarter share. The Fayman-Alter-Herscu partnership would later consolidate their realestate enterprises as the Masaga Group, which later became Hanover Holdings Limited. The eventual success of the centre at Forest Hill laid the foundation of Herscu and Alter's later multi-billion dollar fortune.

Once enough money had been injected, the developers engaged local builder-architect Thord Lorich to carry out a modest redesign and to supervise the centre’s full development. Drawing on contemporary American retail precedents, he prepared a new master plan that introduced a unified design language across the site. Backed by Herscu and Alter, Fayman's team succeeded in persuading supermarket chain owner Bill Pratt and his executives to inspect the Forest Hill site. Alter and Fayman met the delegation at the property, where they proposed that Pratt's Supermarket lease the centre's unfinished 25,000-square-foot department store and convert it into a large self-service supermarket.

Reflecting on the site's condition at the time, one Pratts director later recalled that it consisted of "derelict buildings with cows grazing" and "lots of mud". Following the inspection, Pratt agreed to establish a branch of his self-service supermarket chain at Forest Hill. As part of the agreement, he also arranged for McEwans Hardware to lease a large adjoining store, providing the developing shopping centre with a second major tenant. Shortly afterwards, it was announced that the popular Moores department store chain would become the centre's third major anchor tenant. Meanwhile, real estate agents Blackburn & Lockwood played an instrumental role in securing tenants for the centre's smaller specialty stores.

Yet another press conference to re-announce the centre's opening was held on 2 March 1964. Here, it was revealed that the centre would officially open in 4 months time, and that existing buildings were to be reconfigured to allow its new tenants. (Note: It was also announced that modern public toilet facilities, rare for shopping centres at the time, would be built near the top of Centre Court. The block was designed by architect T. W. Saward and built at a cost of £5,000 in July/August 1964. It was removed in 1975 to make way for redevelopment of the centre.) The anchor stores along Canterbury Road were built with carborundum powder in their facades to create a rainbow sparkling effect in sunlight. Several promotional/charity events were staged at the centre in weeks leading up to the official launch, including an archery demonstration, a fundraiser display of models worth £50,000, and a Motorkhana exhibition in the car park.

== Official opening (1964) ==
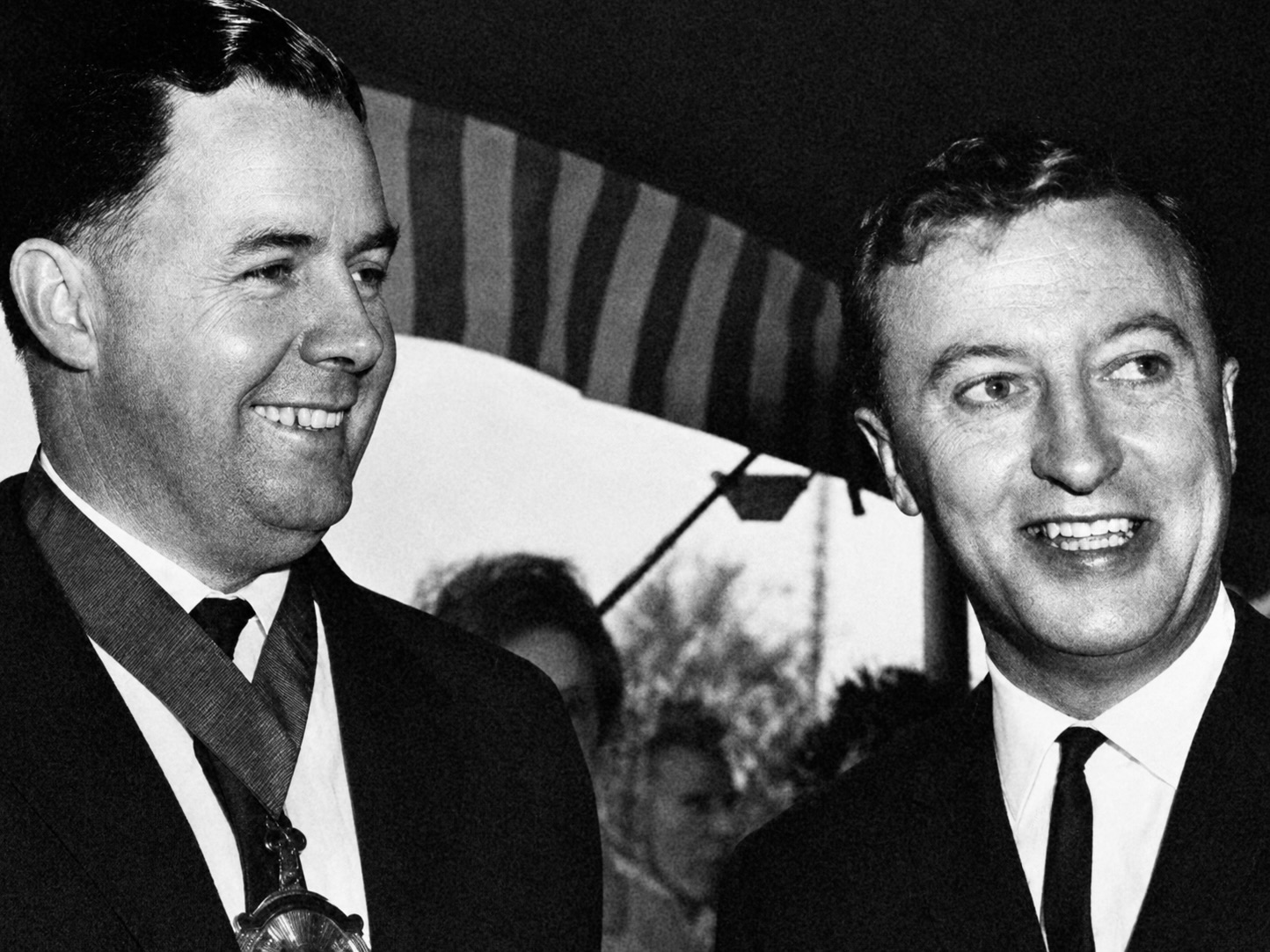
Graham Kennedy (right) with the Mayor of Nunawading at the opening in 1964

The Forest Hills Shopping Centre officially opened on 30th June 1964 at 11am when Nunawading Mayor Owen Goldsborough ceremonially released a bunch of balloons. Popular entertainer Graham Kennedy, then at the peak of his fame with In Melbourne Tonight, made an appearance at the opening event. Some 11 thousand keen shoppers from all over Victoria were there. At the preview before the opening, Bill Pratt supposedly overheard Sir Edgar Coles say to some of his executives: "I have been sending people overseas to find out what is the latest in retailing, now I can send them out here."

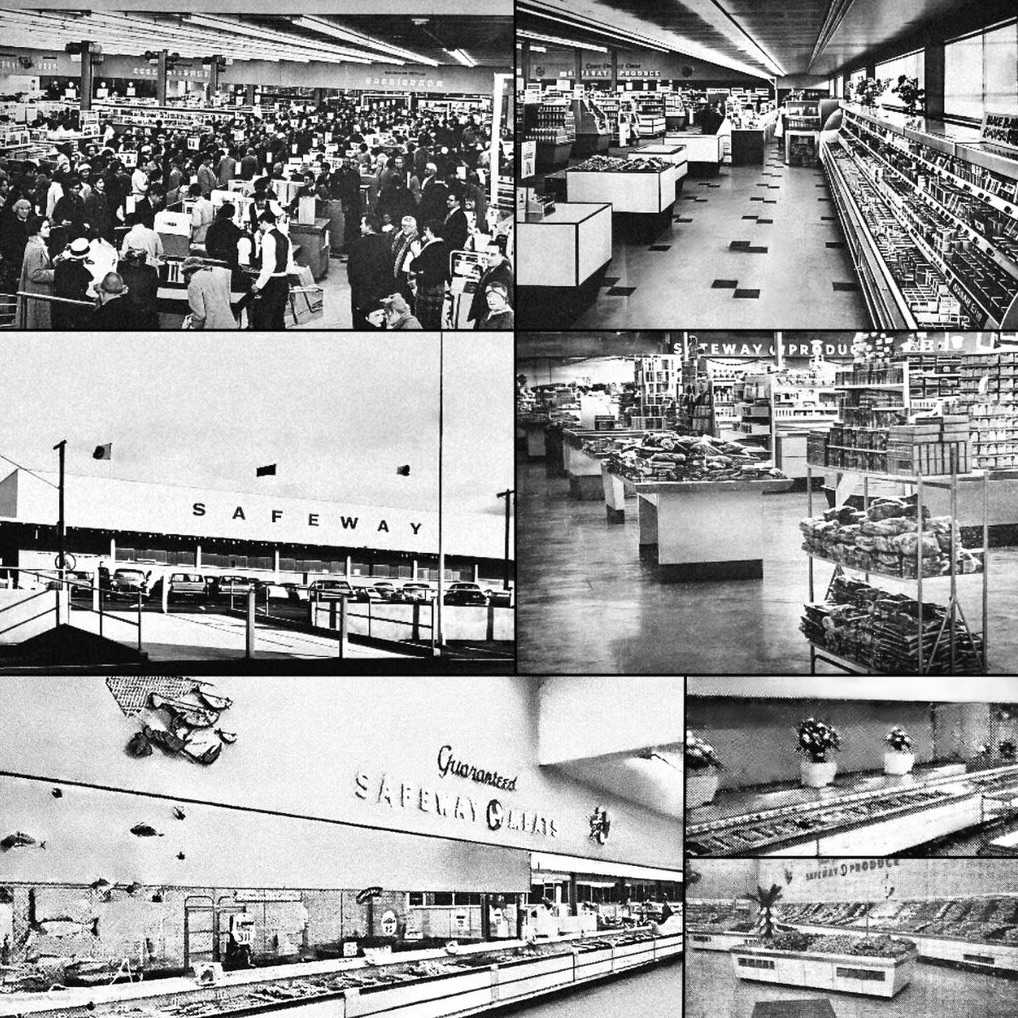
Restored newspaper images of the Safeway supermarket in 1964

When shops opened for business at 9:30am, it appeared as though the opening would be a flop as it was relatively quiet. One store manager said there were only about eight people lining up at his store when he opened for business. But by 10am, the crowd had increased to many thousands. Doors were closed in some stores and shoppers were allowed in at 20 a time. Police were kept busy controlling shoppers traffic. Television cameras were present, however, the recordings have likely since been wiped, this being a common practise at the time.

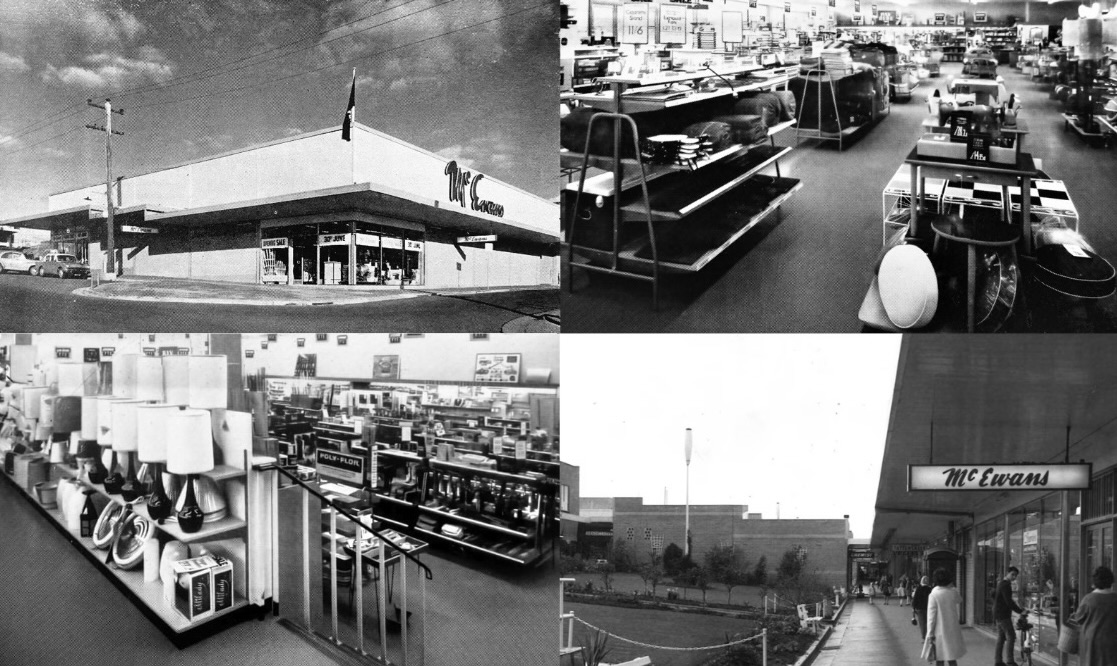
McEwans hardware store in 1964

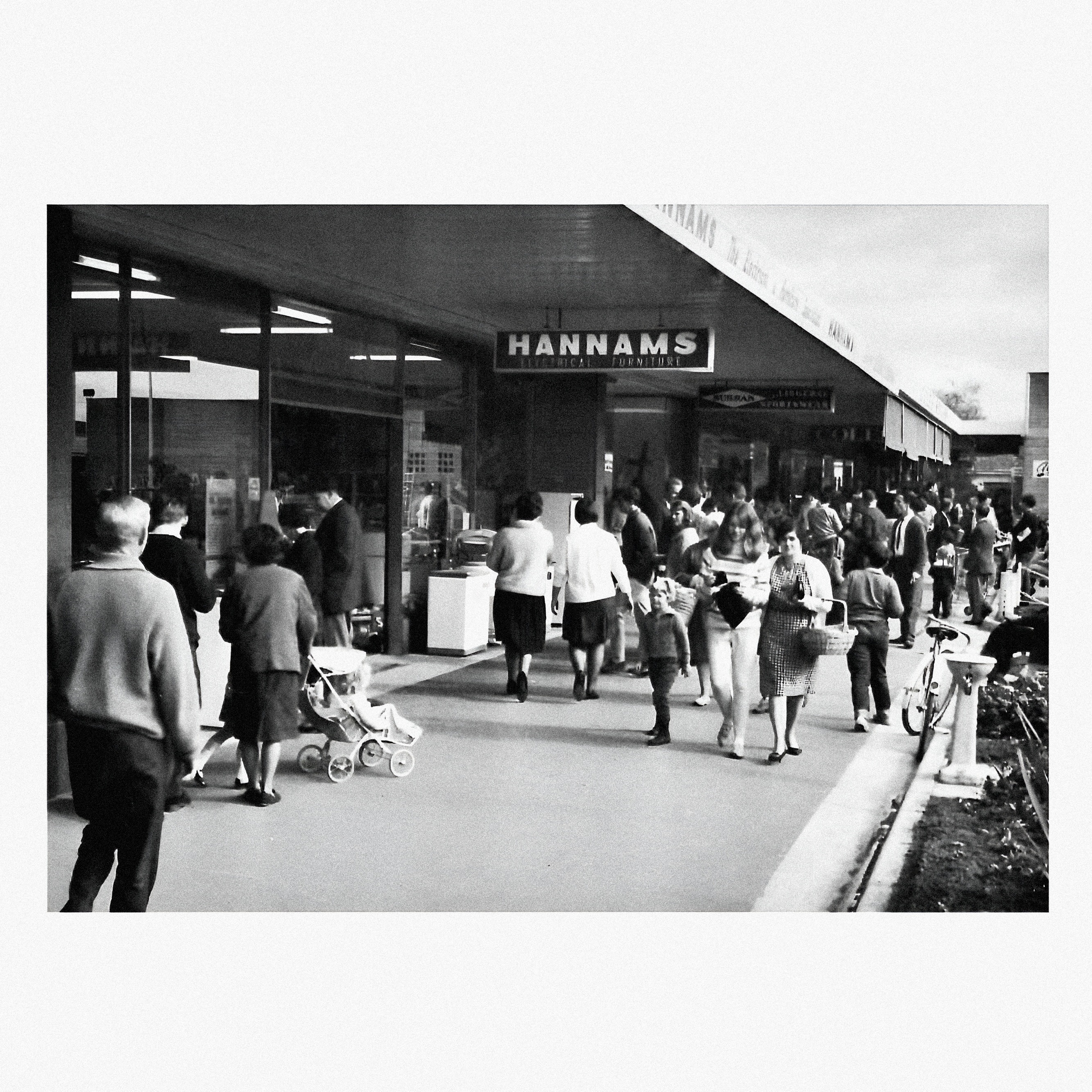
Outdoor mall (1965)

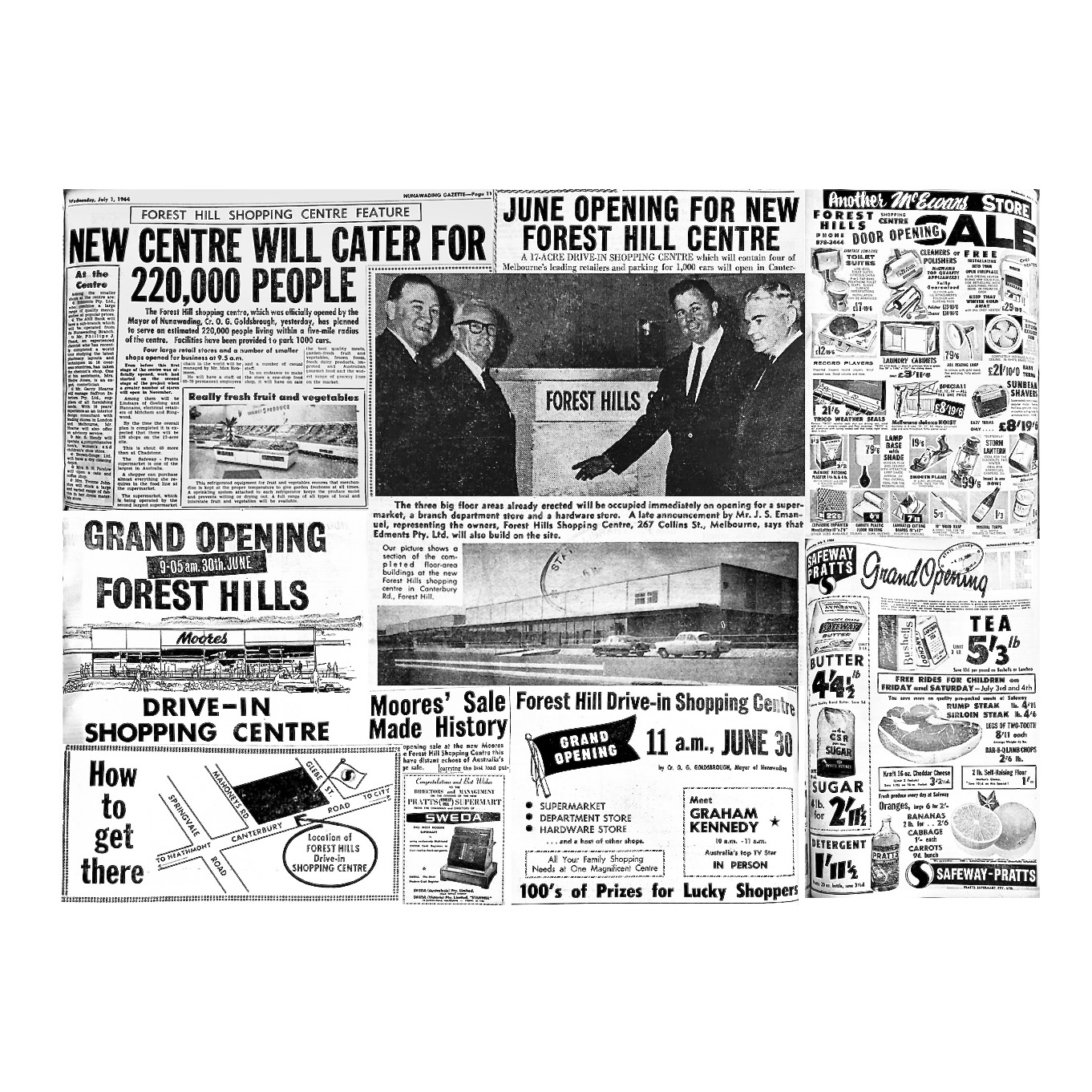
Newspapers (1964)

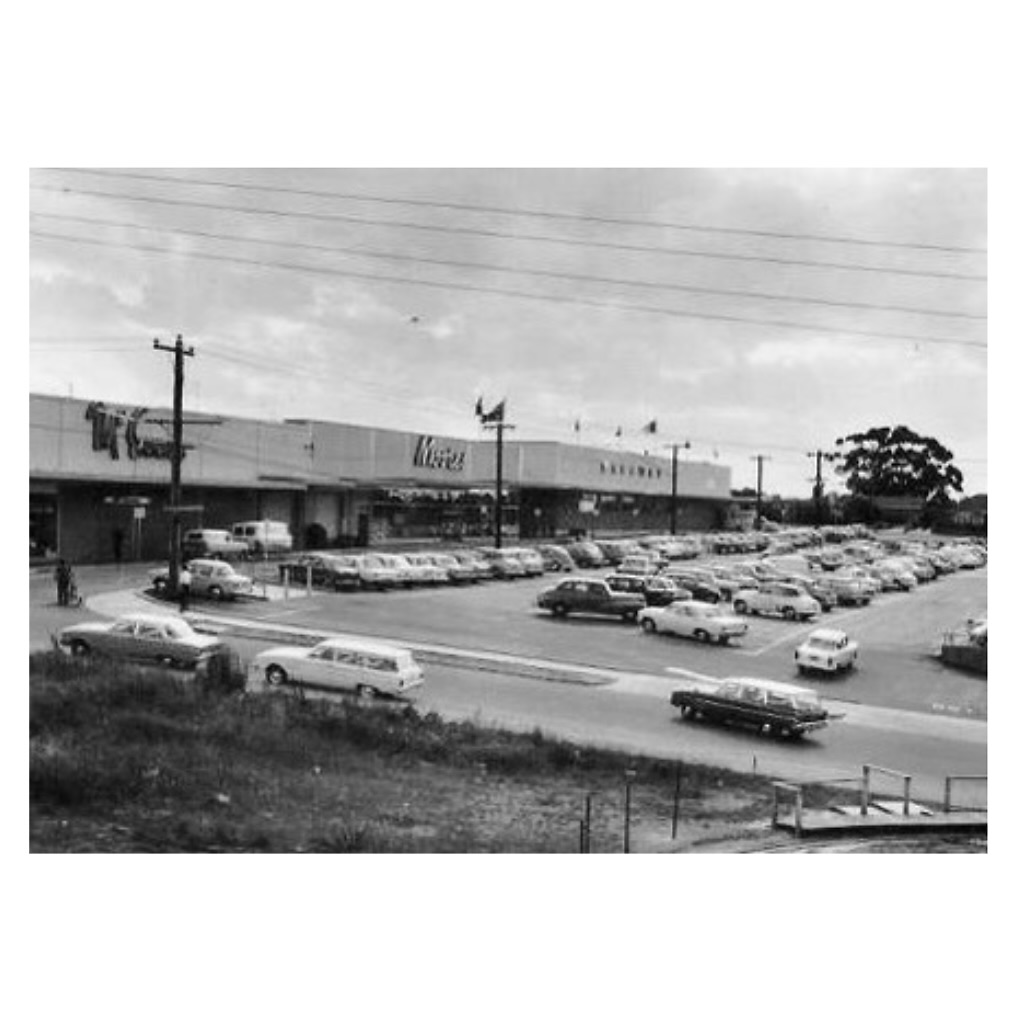
Parking (1964)

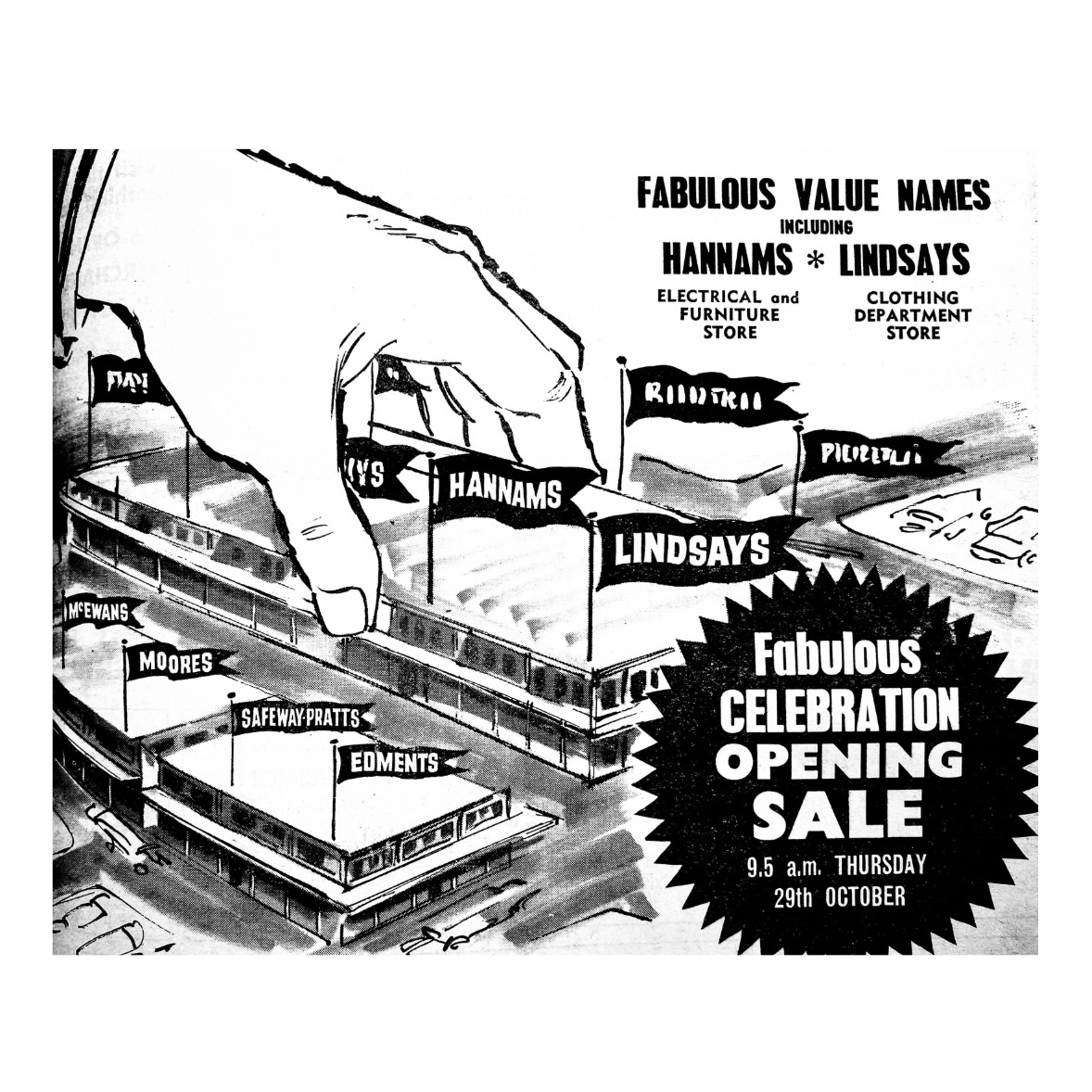
Promo art (1964)

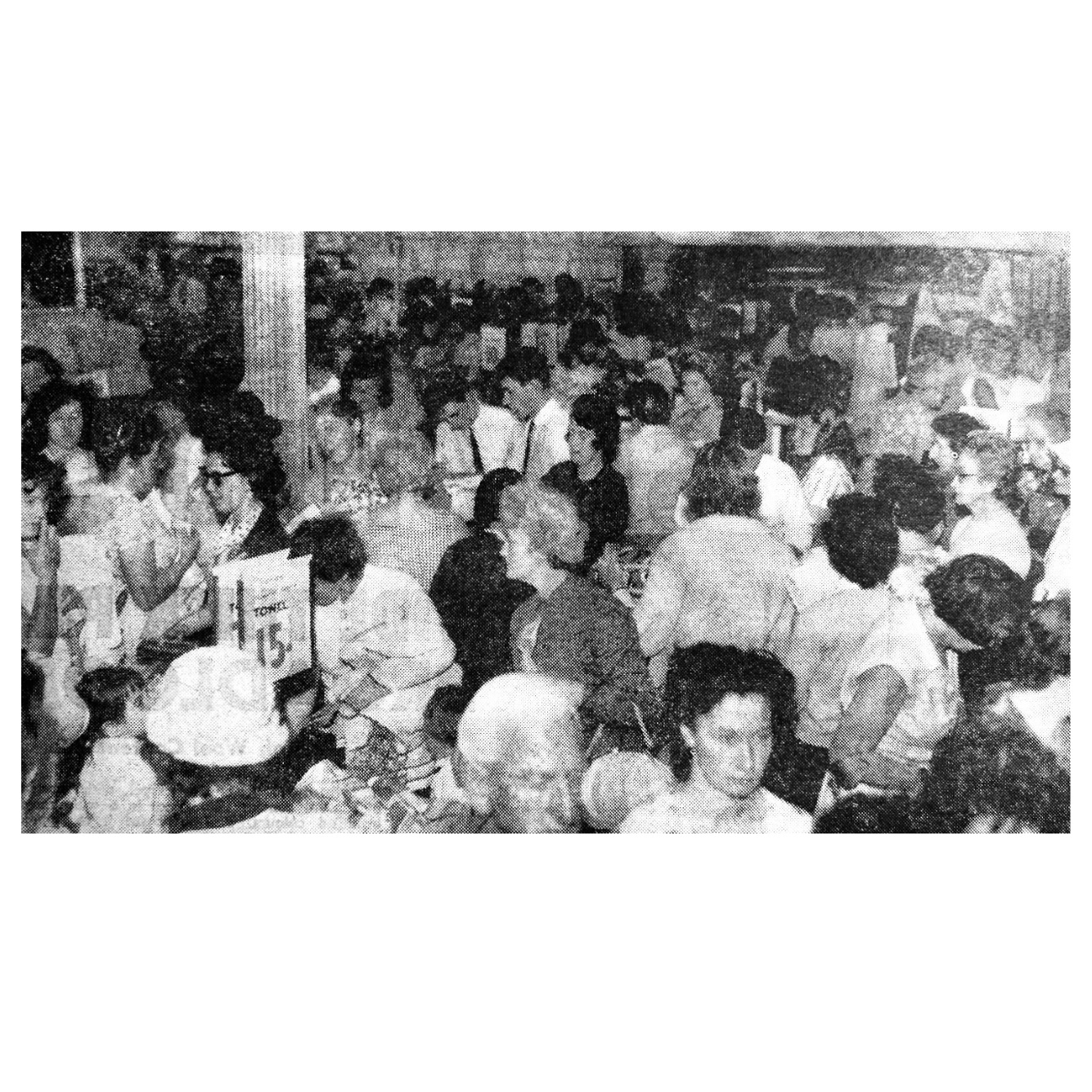
Lindsays (1964)

The first Safeway-branded supermarket in Australia had 12 checkout points and a staff of more than 50 assistants, making it the largest all-food supermarket in the country. It also had the largest self-service refrigeration installation in the country, engineered by Kelvinator. The building had originally been purpose-built four years prior as a department store which never opened. Safeway reported around 11,000 people had passed through its doors on that first day, generating substantial revenue. One Safeway executive said that Graham Kennedy, who toured the centre for over an hour, was responsible for bringing a lot of people to the opening event. "Sales staff had to force shoppers back to make a path for him" he said. The first stage opening celebrations concluded when actress Evie Hayes visited the new centre and met with customers as part of a promotional event for Safeway in mid-July.

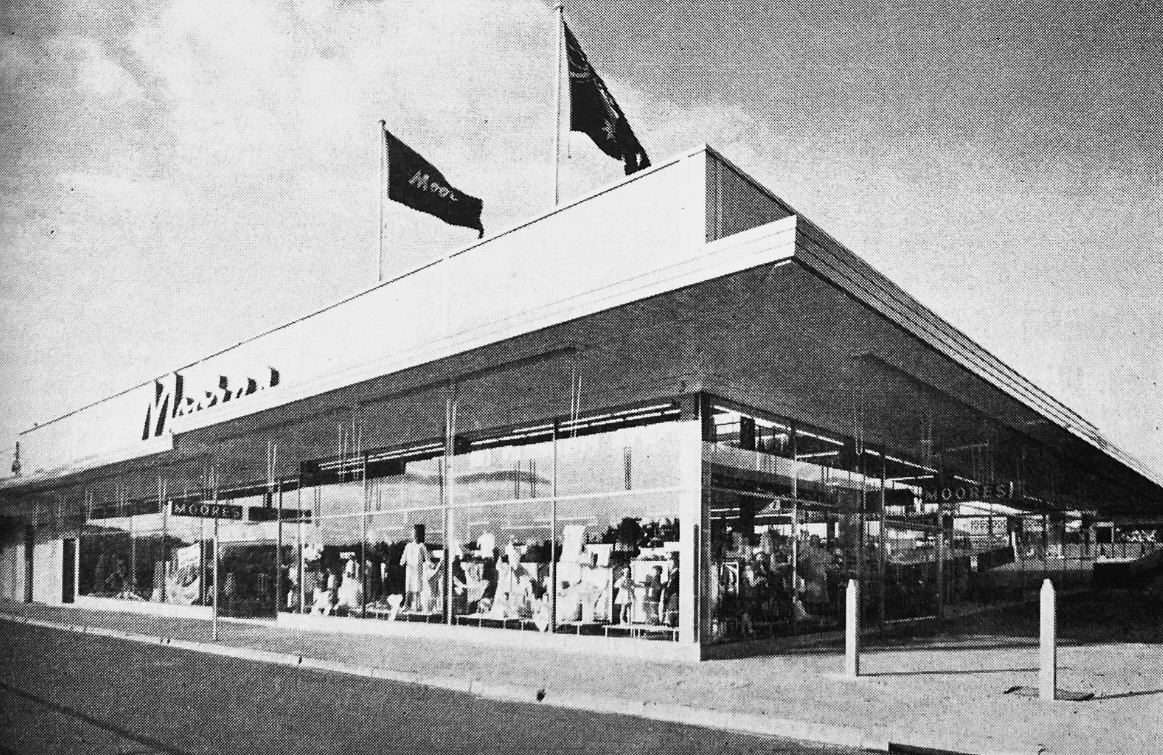
Moores department store in 1964

The centre's department store was originally leased to national chain Moores, who served about 8,000 customers on that first day. They had to order additional staff and registers from their city branches to handle the unprecedented demand. Its staff of about 35 included a trained corsetmaker and a cosmetician. The McEwans hardware store was known for its unique split-level sales floor and served around 5000 customers on the first day.

=== Original layout ===
As built, the original centre was a single-level, open-air strip complex built around a rectangular inner block called Canterbury Court, where two landscaped courtyards were enclosed by a continuous ring of shops. An angled, sloping spine of stores known as Centre Court cut through the middle of the block, linking the large front and rear car parks while dividing the twin courtyards. A service loop encircled the retail block, and a separate row of narrow, ancillary shops lined the eastern boundary along Mahoneys Road.

== Second and thirds stages (1964-69) ==
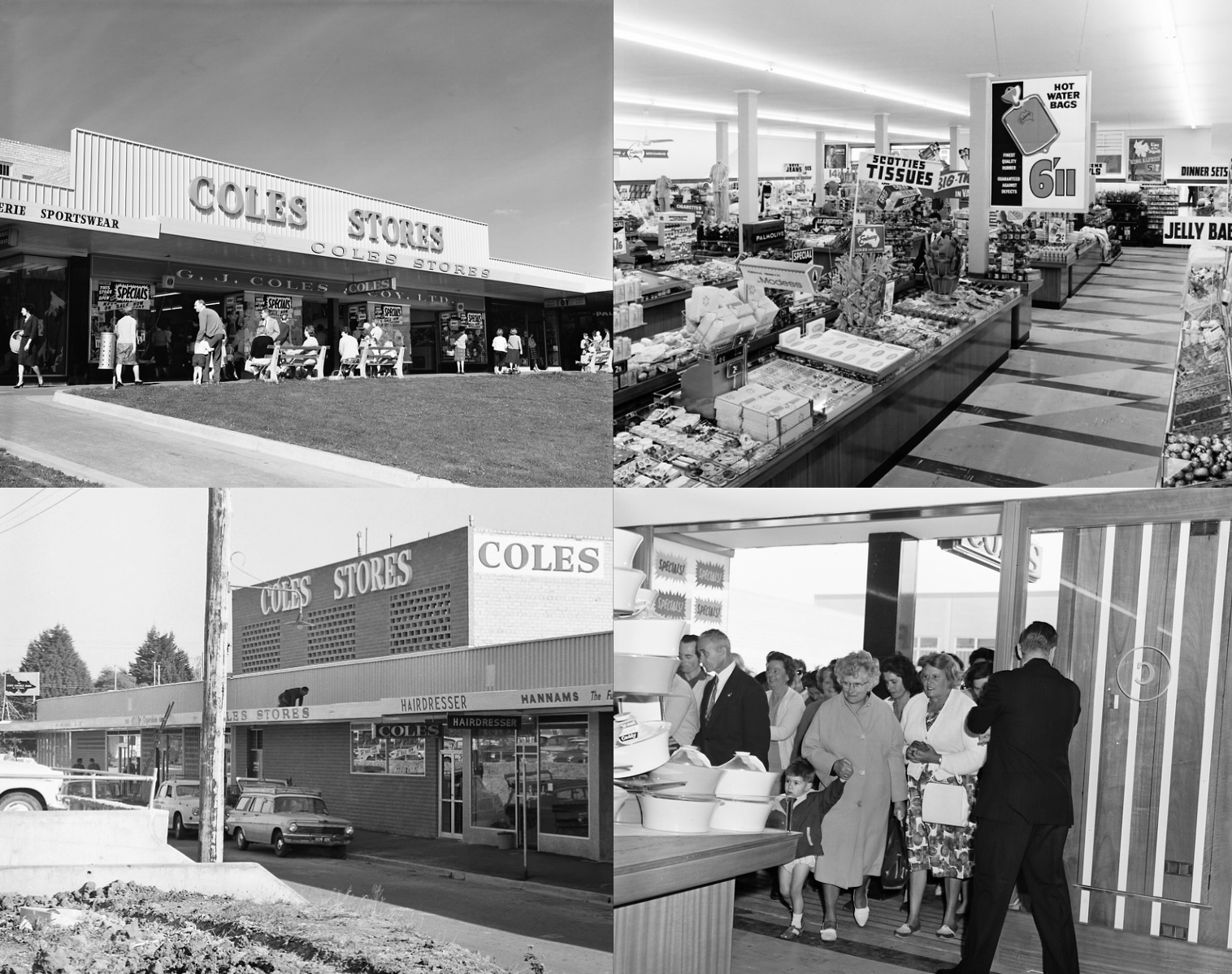
Coles variety store in 1965

Two weeks after the highly-successful opening event, it was announced after much speculation that Coles would build a variety store at Forest Hills, anchoring the second stage of the centre's development. This launched early the following year to much success. In September 1964, a week-long school holiday gala was held at the centre which included guest appearances from children's Television Stars Joff Ellen, Norman Swain, and Gerry Gee & Ron Blaskett.

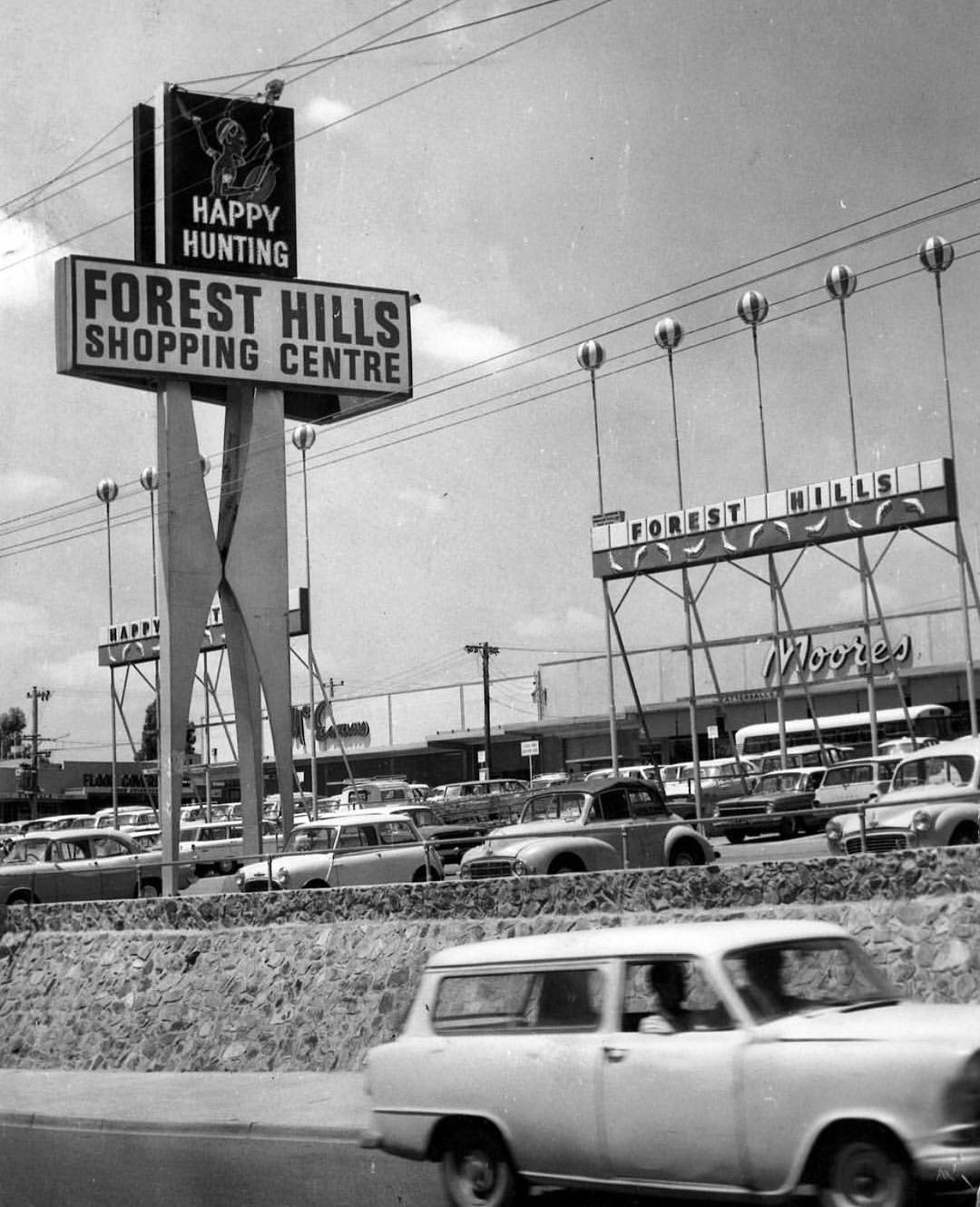
Architect-designed signs along the frontage to Canterbury Road c1968

By late 1964, new shops were opening at Forest Hills weekly. A local periodical reported in September 1964 that "Hundreds of men are busy at work laying thousands of bricks, placing huge steel roof trusses and laying hundreds of miles of wiring and piping in their race to prepare many additional shops which are due to open in late October." This came with the opening of Lindsays on 29 October 1964, attracting a rush of over 6500 customers.

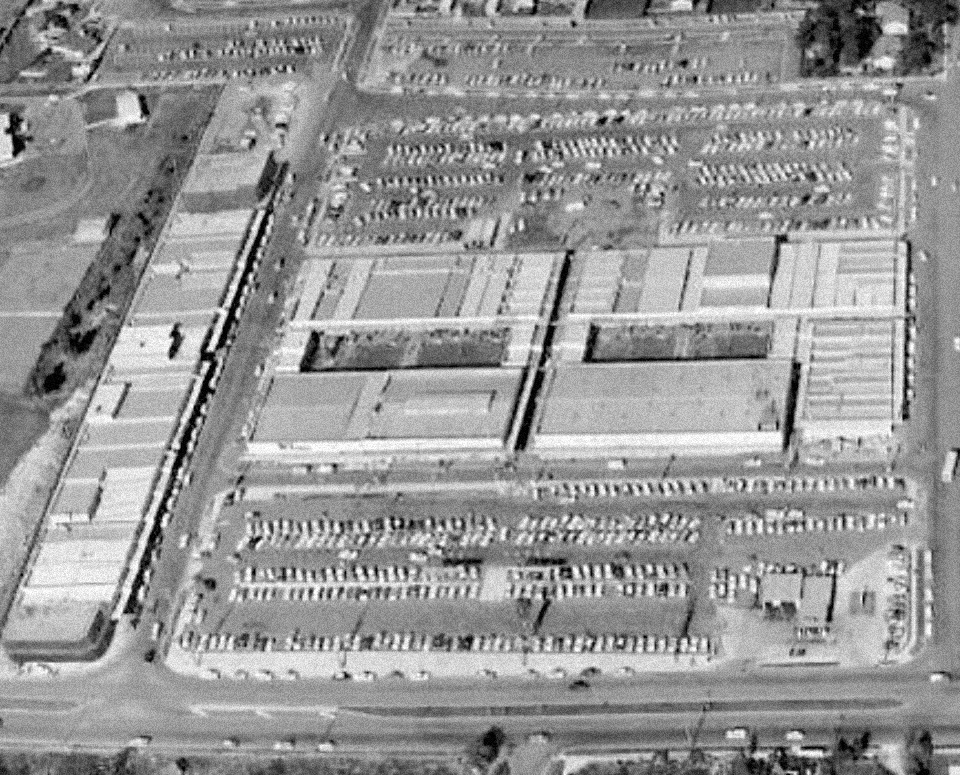
1968 aerial view showing the new additions on the east side of Mahoneys Road, including the Forest Hills Theatre

The centre's architect, Thord Lorich, received high praise from the developers for his contribution to the centre's commercial success, and he soon became the in-house architect for the developer's shop-building operation. In early 1965, Lorich ordered a multi-level climbing structure in the shape of a rocket to be installed in the centre's eastern garden court. It was extremely popular with several generations of children and was widely regarded as a local landmark.

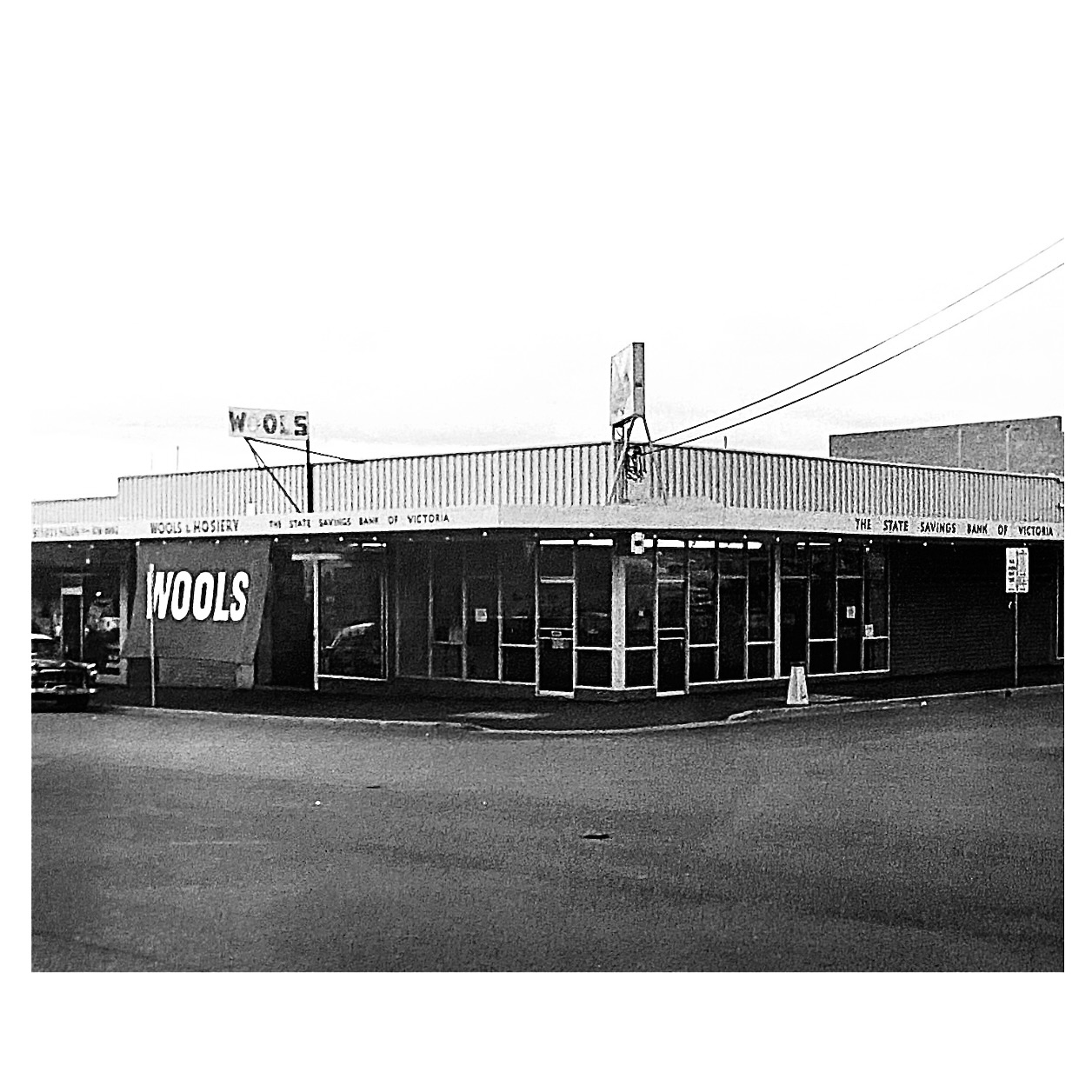
State bank (1966)

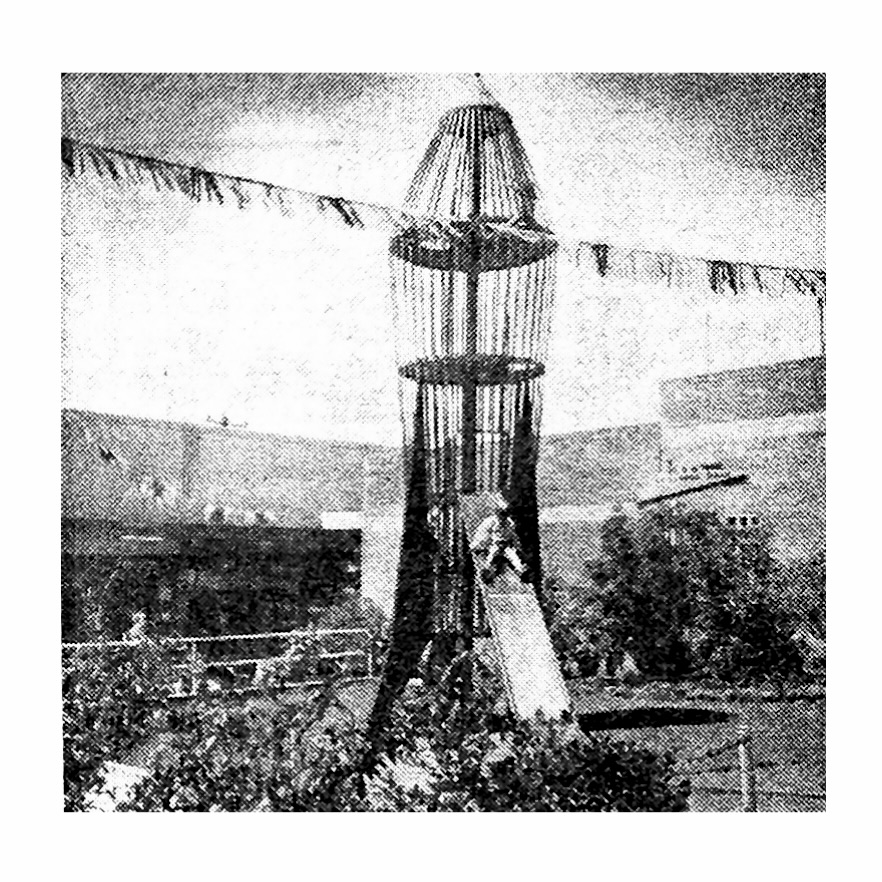
Playground (1967)

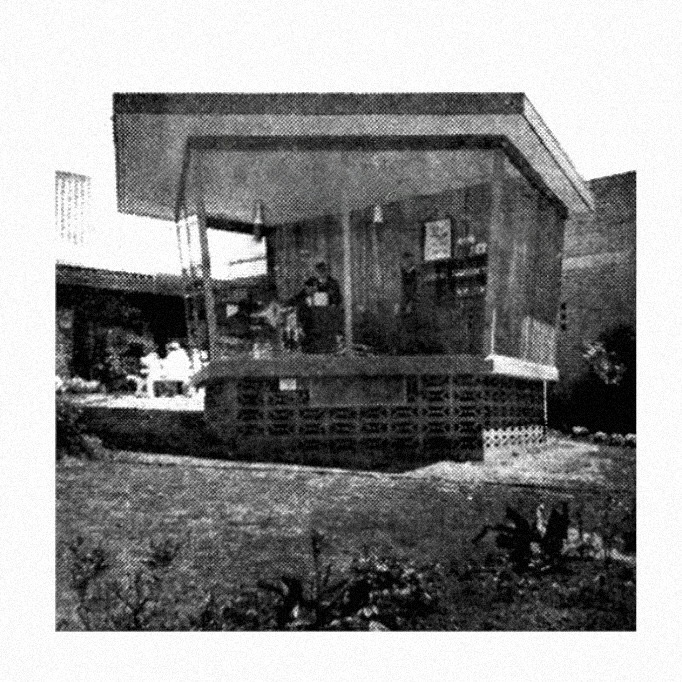
Radio booth (1967)

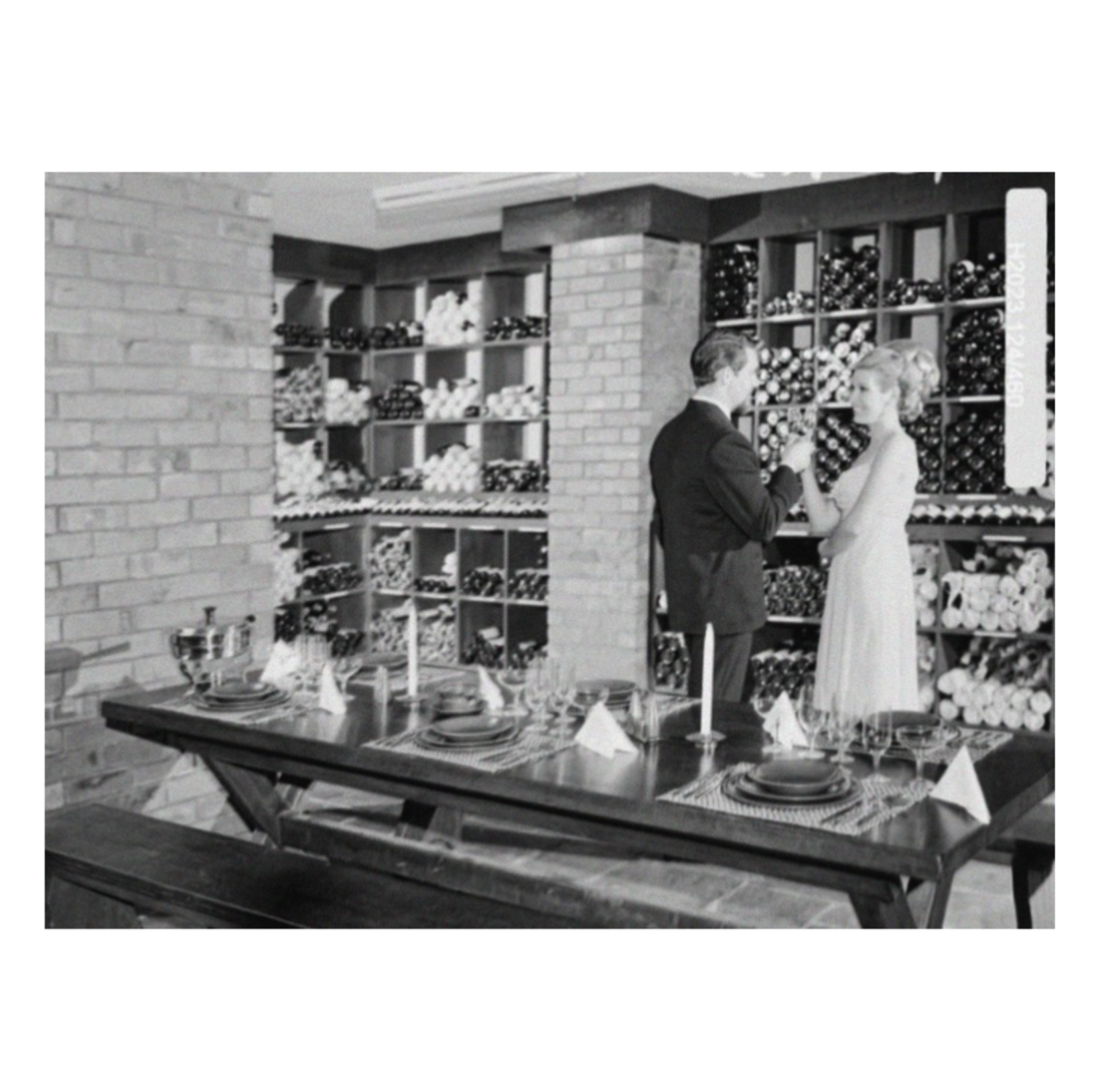
Wine cellar (1968)

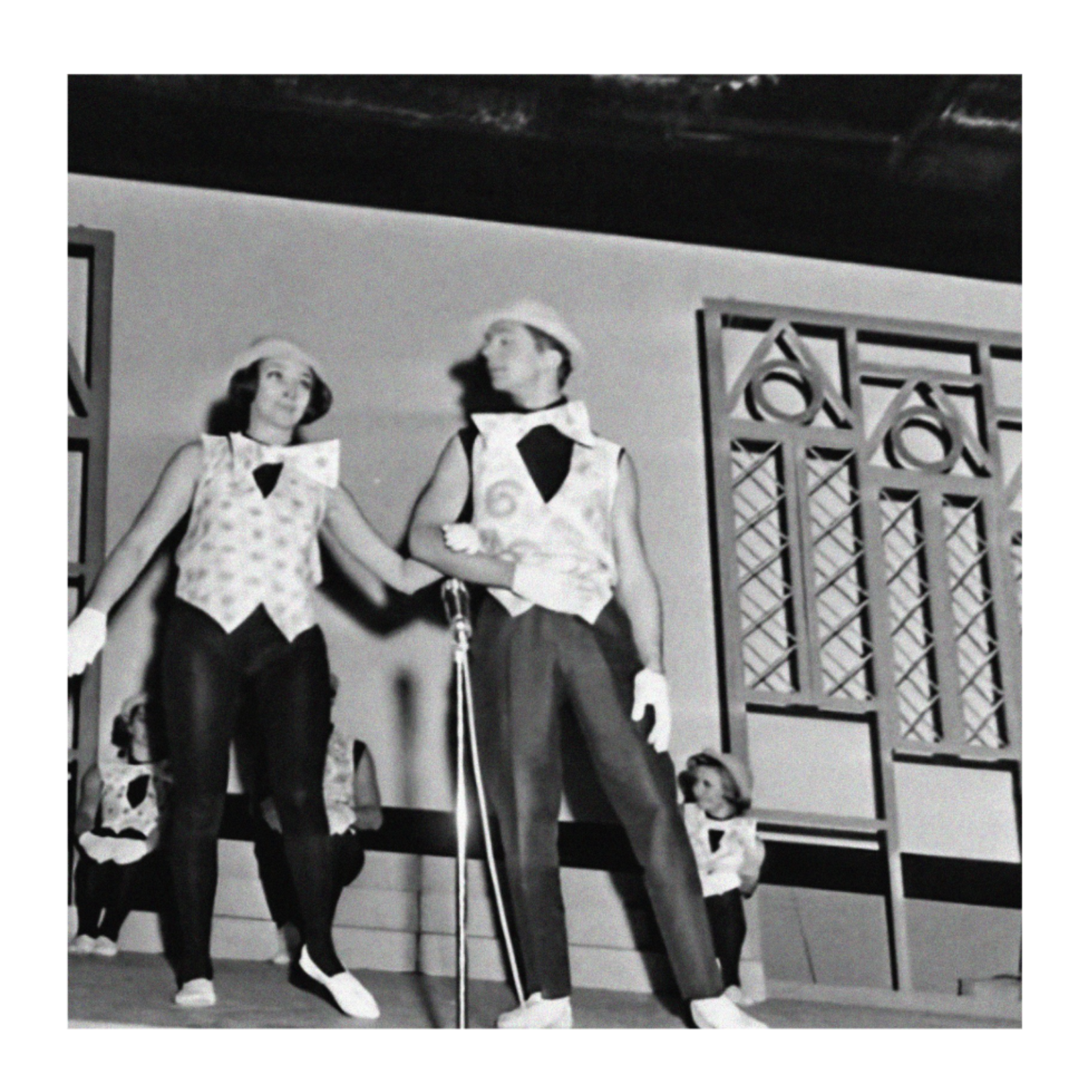
Matinee (1968)

To celebrate three years of the centre's operation, in mid-1967, centre management staged a "shopping gala" with an entertainment program, celebrity guest appearances and expensive prize-winning competitions. By arrangement with the nearby ATV-0 studios, talent show host Gordon Boyd sang at the centre on 27 July 1967 to open the celebrations. Then came Radio 3UZZ's Noel Ferrier and Mary Hardy on, who hosted a live radio show in the outdoor courtyards. The main attraction came on 7 July, when ATV-0 star Jimmy Hannan visited the centre for a live segment of his daytime show, Take a Letter.

In December 1967, centre management announced $4m had been invested into the centre's expansion. Thord Lorich designed a double-storey restaurant, a sports centre with a pool, a radio broadcasting booth, additional shops, and a picture theatre. The program was fast-tracked in response to the announcement that several rival centres were soon to be opened in surrounding suburbs, including the Old Orchard Shopping Centre at Blackburn and Australia's first Kmart at Burwood.

In early 1967, former Mayor of Prahran Emlyn Jones secured the lease of a store below the soon-to-be built Forest Hills Theatre. He obtained a liquor license in mid-1968 and spent the resulting months meticulously fitting out and decorating the space in preparation for its scheduled opening in August as Forest Hill Cellars. A reporter from the Nunawading Gazette described it as the "biggest, most imaginative, fully equipped cellar in the area". The shop was later taken over by the Mac's San Remo chain and has since been repurposed.

=== Corner restaurant (1-3 Mahoneys Road) ===
Crystal Forest restaurant at the corner of Canterbury and Mahoneys Roads in 1968

A contemporary double-storey restaurant opened on the corner of Canterbury and Mahoneys Roads. It was originally leased by Frank Dennis, who operated the fully-licensed Crystal Forest restaurant for 13 years before reopening it in 1973 as the Digger's Den. At the time, it was among the most popular dining spots in the area with a luxurious interior and an extravagant modernist facade. The ground-floor dining area had a capacity of 100, and a large function space upstairs could hold about 300.

In 1980, it was refurbished and reopened as a Cantonese live seafood restaurant called Dragons Court. and later operated as Phase 2, which served a wider range of asian cuisine. The building was reconfigured to allow two separate tenancies not long after it suffered a fire in 2003. These are currently (as of 2026) occupied by KamBo (ground floor) and Kbox (first floor).

=== Multi-purpose building (69–79 Mahoneys Road) ===
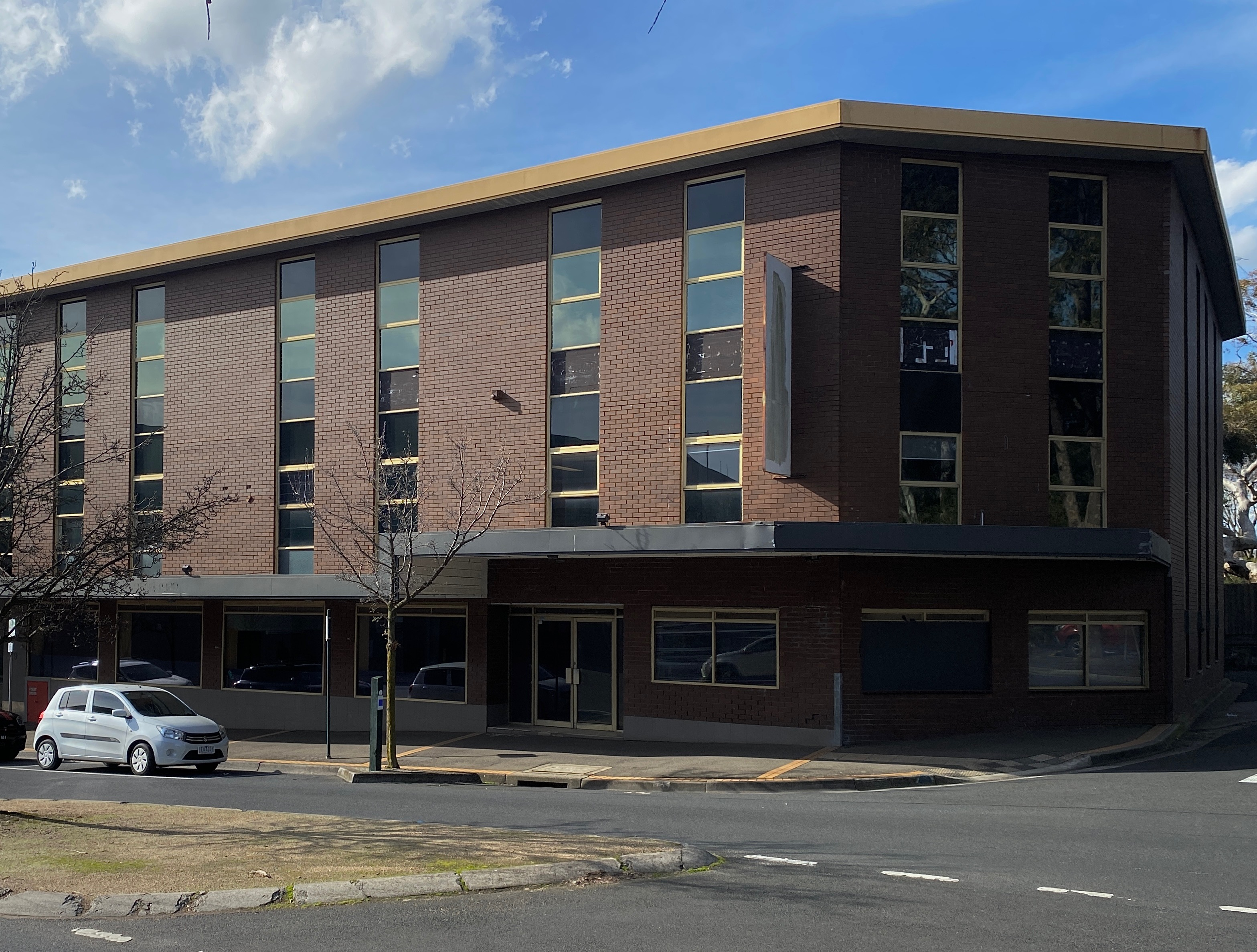
Multi-purpose building in 2024

In 1966, architect Thord Lorich drew up an initial concept for a new sports centre at the Forest Hills Shopping Centre—a fairly restrained, two-storey mix of gym and retail. By May 1968, the owners had formally progressed the plan, but things shifted when developer George Herscu pushed to double the floor space at the last minute to squeeze in another office level. The result was far more commanding than first intended: a bold, horizontal roofline with deep cantilevered eaves that gave the building a strong street presence for Forest Hill at the time.

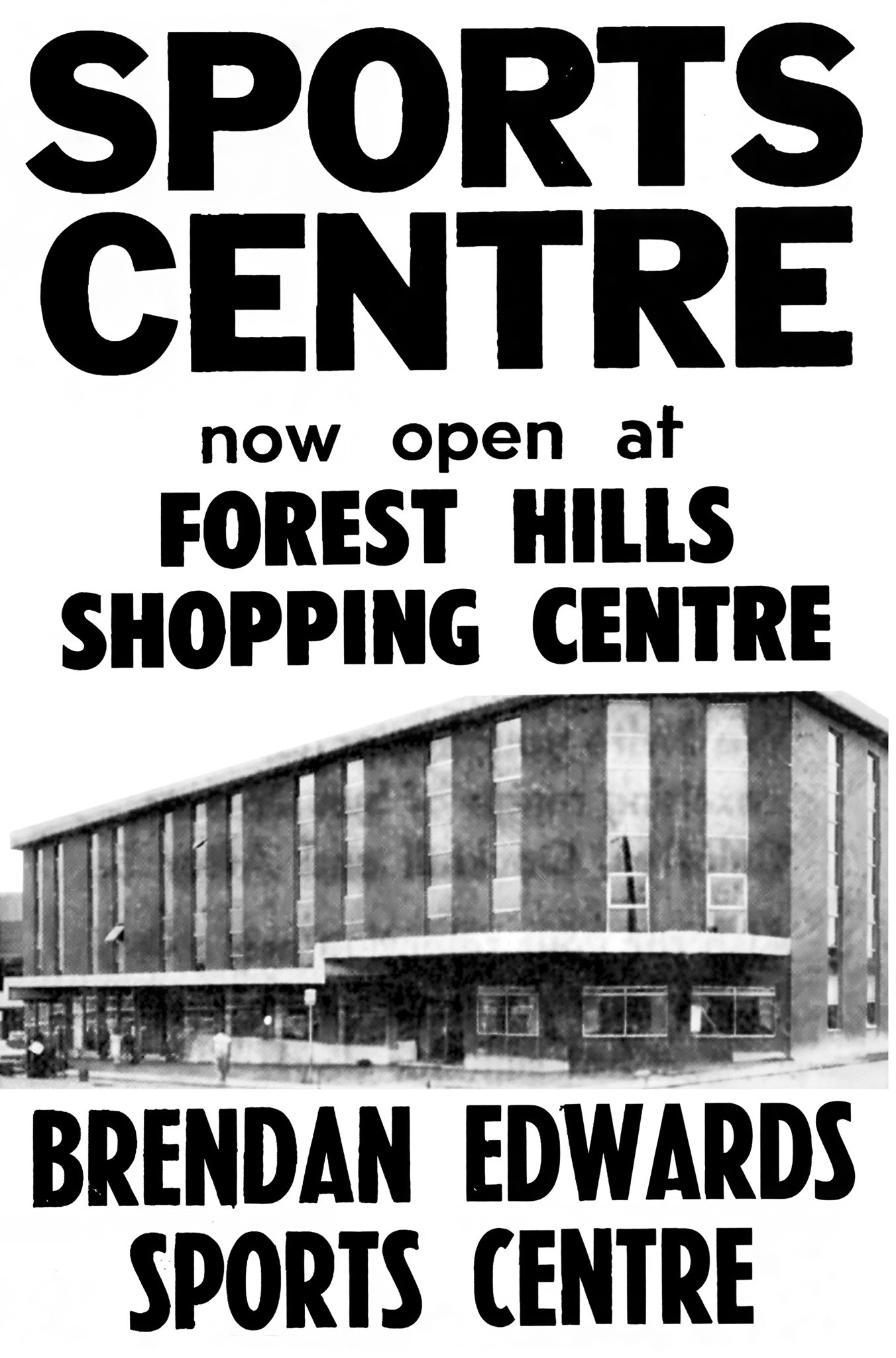
Advertisement for sports centre, 1969

Work began in September 1968, and about a year later the multi-storey complex opened as one of the tallest commercial buildings in the district. It was marketed as a prestige development, designed to serve the thousands visiting the shopping centre. Herscu was particularly fond of it, housing his company Montvale Developments there in the 1970s, while centre management and the Forest Hill Traders Association occupied several suites until surrounding redevelopment in the late 1980s.

Architecturally, it remains one of the most intact post-war commercial buildings in the area. The façade stands out for its tall, rhythmic vertical window bays in anodised gold, echoing the crisp corporate style of the 1960s. Inside, much of the original high-end detailing survives: terrazzo floors, brass balustrades, textured ceilings, decorative wall panelling, and even the original Johns & Waygood traction lift.

The sports centre itself spanned several levels and was ambitious for its time: a heated tiled plunge pool and spa, sauna, crèche, coffee lounge, and even an in-ground trampoline area. Operated first by the Brendan Edwards fitness chain, it opened in late 1969. Between 1977 and 1987, it was leased to local sportsman John Driver followed by Lifestyle Fitness during the 1990s.

Metro Health & Fitness followed in 2001, running the Forest Hill Swim School until 2005, after which much of the original tenancy again fell vacant. Since then, parts of the building have been adapted for new uses: the former top-floor crèche became the Whitehorse Community Resource Centre in 2011, while the entire ground floor is now occupied by Fresenius Medical Care, providing kidney dialysis services.

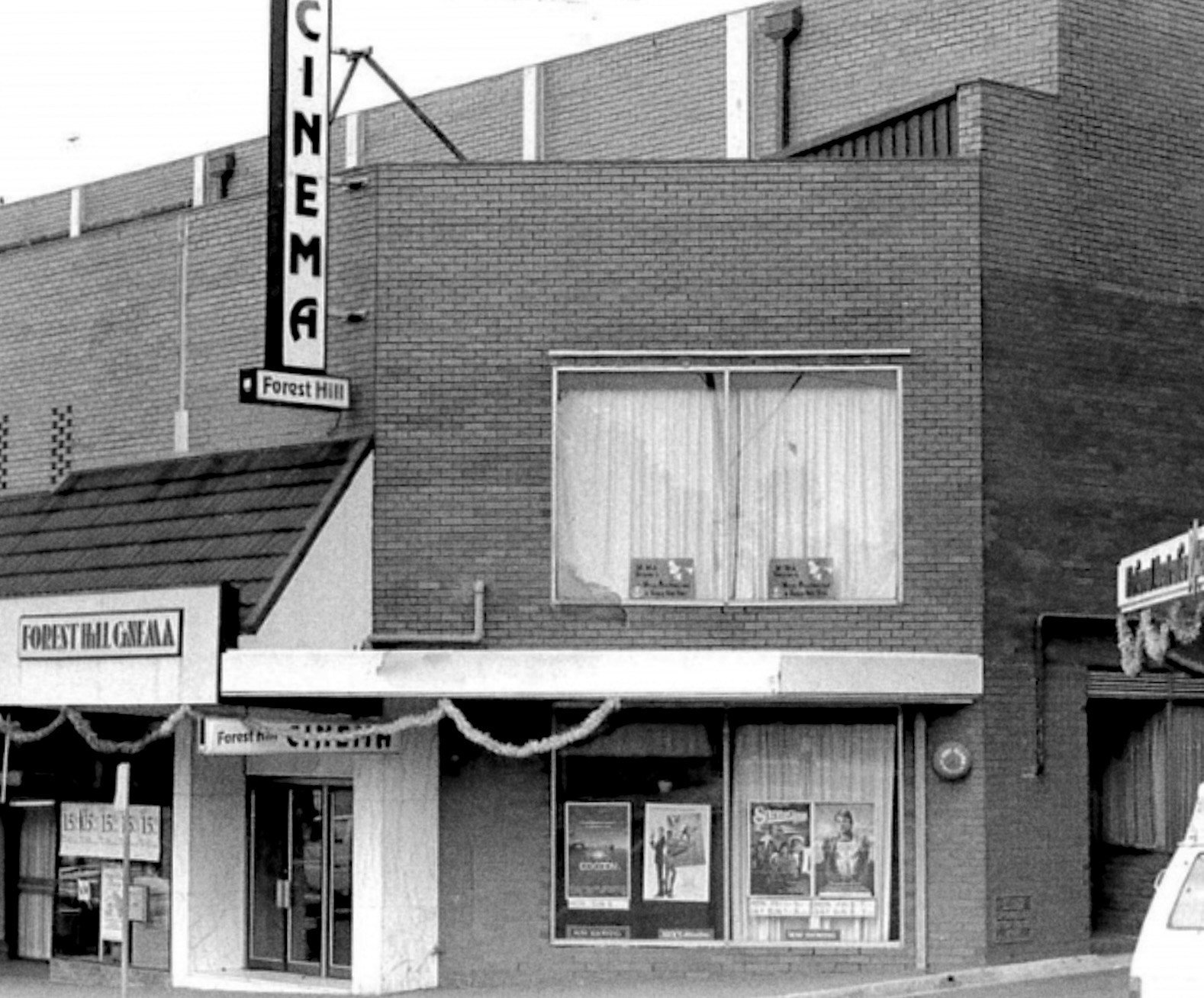
Forest Hill Cinema, 1980s

=== Forest Hill Cinema (67 Mahoneys Road) ===
In 1967, it was announced that an auditorium designed to TV studio specifications would be constructed on Mahoneys Road, and would run daily matinees for shoppers, special audiences and schools. It became the first purpose-built picture theatre in Nunawading, boasting over 360 seats, a snack bar, coffee lounge and two adjoining shops.

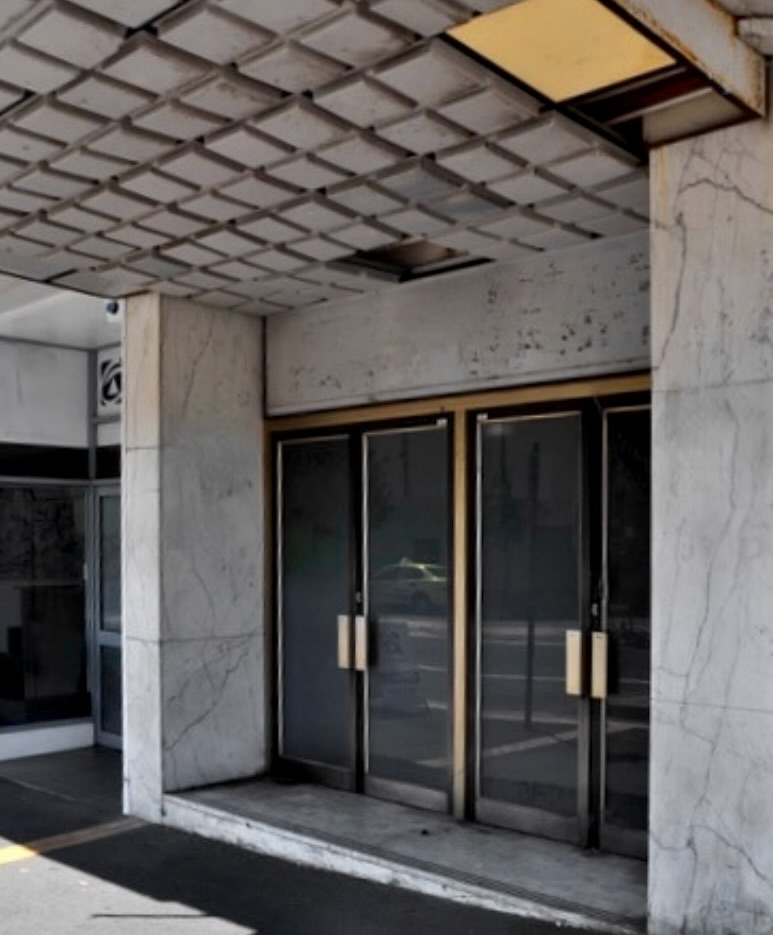
Former theatre entrance, 2010

Designed by local architect Thord Lorich with advice from engineers at the nearby ATV-0 studios, the tall utilitarian building is clad with a midcentury cream brick veneer and decorated with occasional terrazzo, ceramic and granolithic finishes. Roller doors were incorporated into the second storey facade to allow for direct camera/equipment installation. A gallery and orchestra balcony overlooked the auditorium.

The opening night took place on 31 May 1968, with an entertainment programme including dancers and a screening of Otto Preminger's Hurry Sundown with music by local musician Vic Conner at the Hammond organ. ATV-0 beamed a test colour television transmission from their nearby studios at Hawthorn Road to the cinema in March 1970, five years before colour broadcasts were formally introduced to Australia.

In December 1971, the stage was turned into a makeshift ice skating rink for use in a series of specially-produced revues or pantomimes starring John McKilligan, Suzanne Hill, and Marilyn Wright. Another event was the premier of Giorgio Mangiamele's locally-produced film Beyond Reason in May 1970. The theatre's original operators, an independent company called Sherwood Productions, experienced financial and legal troubles leading to an early lease termination. The cinema re-opened by January 1970 with Dendy as the operator, who made minor alterations including a reduction of seating from 362 to 337 and some equipment upgrades. Village took over in 1978 followed by Palace in 1980.

The building ceased screening movies after its closure in September 1989, shortly before Hoyts opened across the road in the new Forest Hill Chase redevelopment. It had its last full house as a cinema on 20 May 1988 when it screened Crocodile Dundee II – which sold so many tickets that patrons were overflowing into the projection booth.

In 1990, steak and seafood chain The Keg used the building as a temporary recruitment office. By 1992, the building had been converted into a nightclub venue called "The Bunker" – its name being a nod to the building's unique proportions and bunker-like appearance. The venue quickly became one of the most popular clubbing venues in Melbourne's middle/outer east, but would soon close due an uprise in antisocial behaviour.

By popular demand, centre management worked with council officers and local police to re-open it as "Club 3131", a community-based blue light disco. This closed in the early 2000s, and the building sat vacant for a number of years before it was eventually converted into a ballet studio and later a community theatre. These have since closed, and the building sits vacant.

== Fourth stage (1973–76) ==
In 1973, the centre's owners hired the Office of Ernest Fooks to design a redevelopment and modernisation plan for the centre, which was to be undertaken passively over the following years. It was formally revealed that the centre's front car park would be replaced by a multi-deck parking garage, and that the rear car park would be redeveloped into a split-level indoor shopping centre with a marketplace.

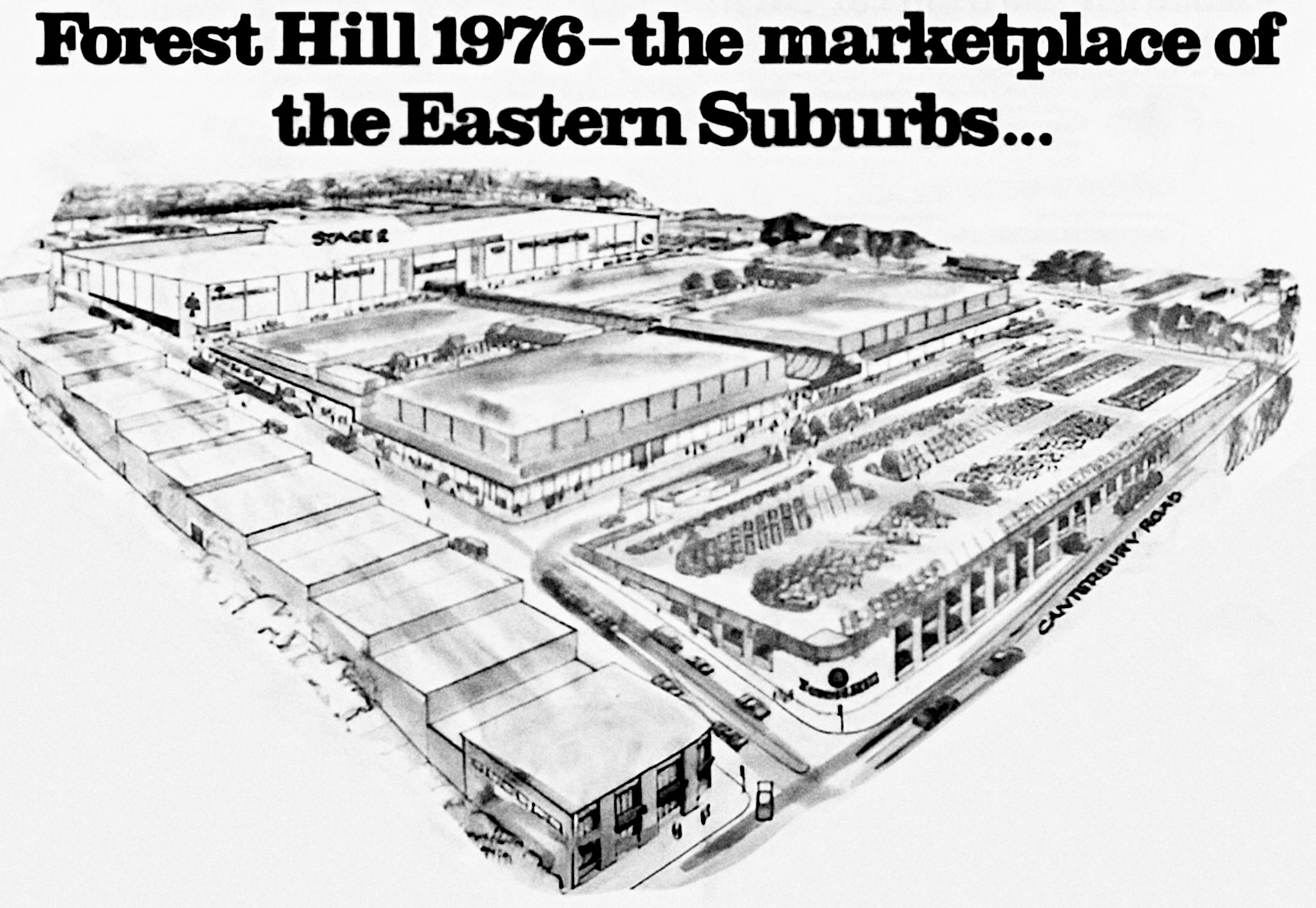
Artist's impression of proposed redevelopment, c1975

Safeway moved from their landmark tenancy near Canterbury Road to a newer, purpose-built store in the lower level of the new building. A Woolworths supermarket and the largest McEwans hardware store outside of the city occupied the upper level. The redevelopment was built in the late modernism style, and the front parking garage featured ornamental concreting. The redevelopment opened on 20 July 1976.

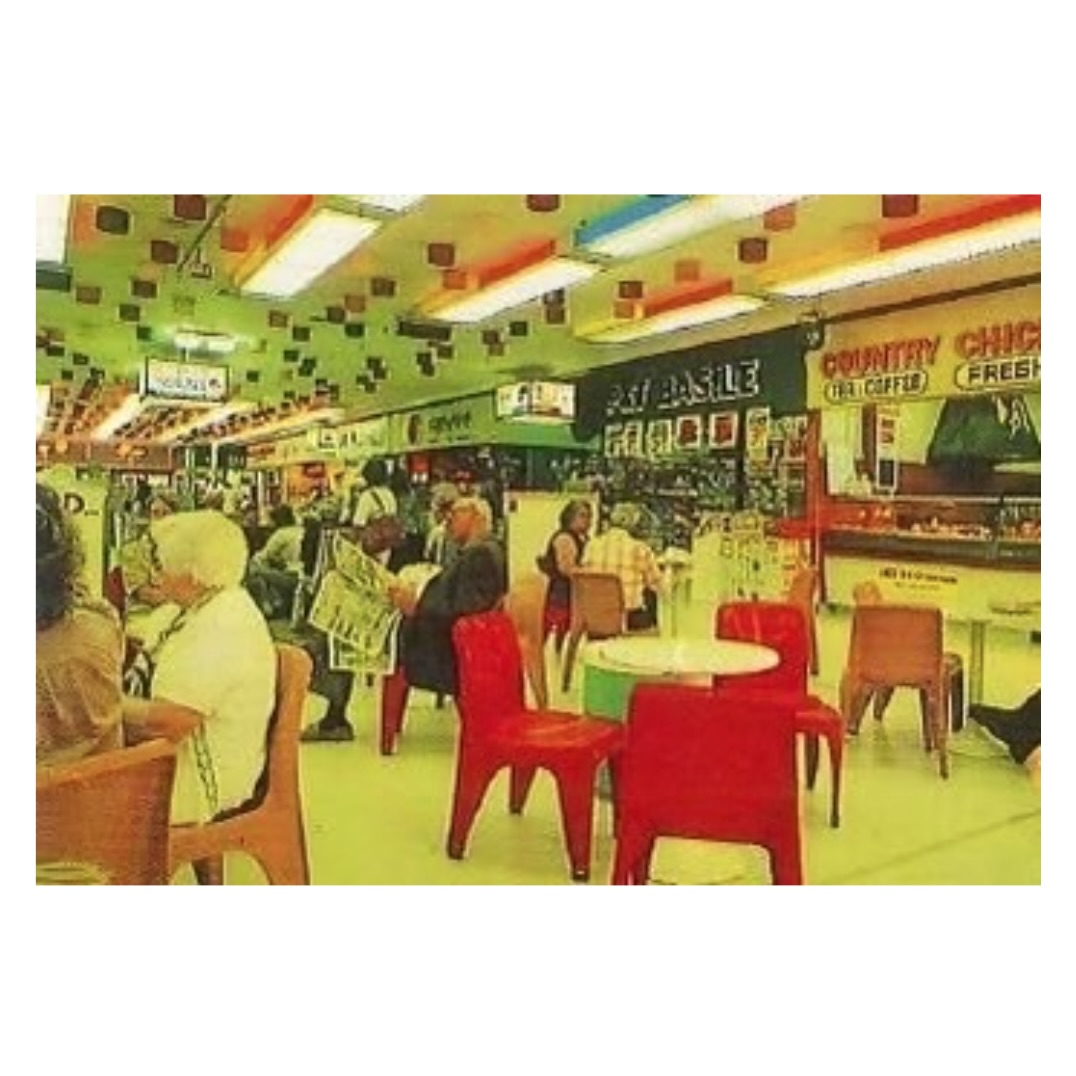
Indoor food court (1980s)

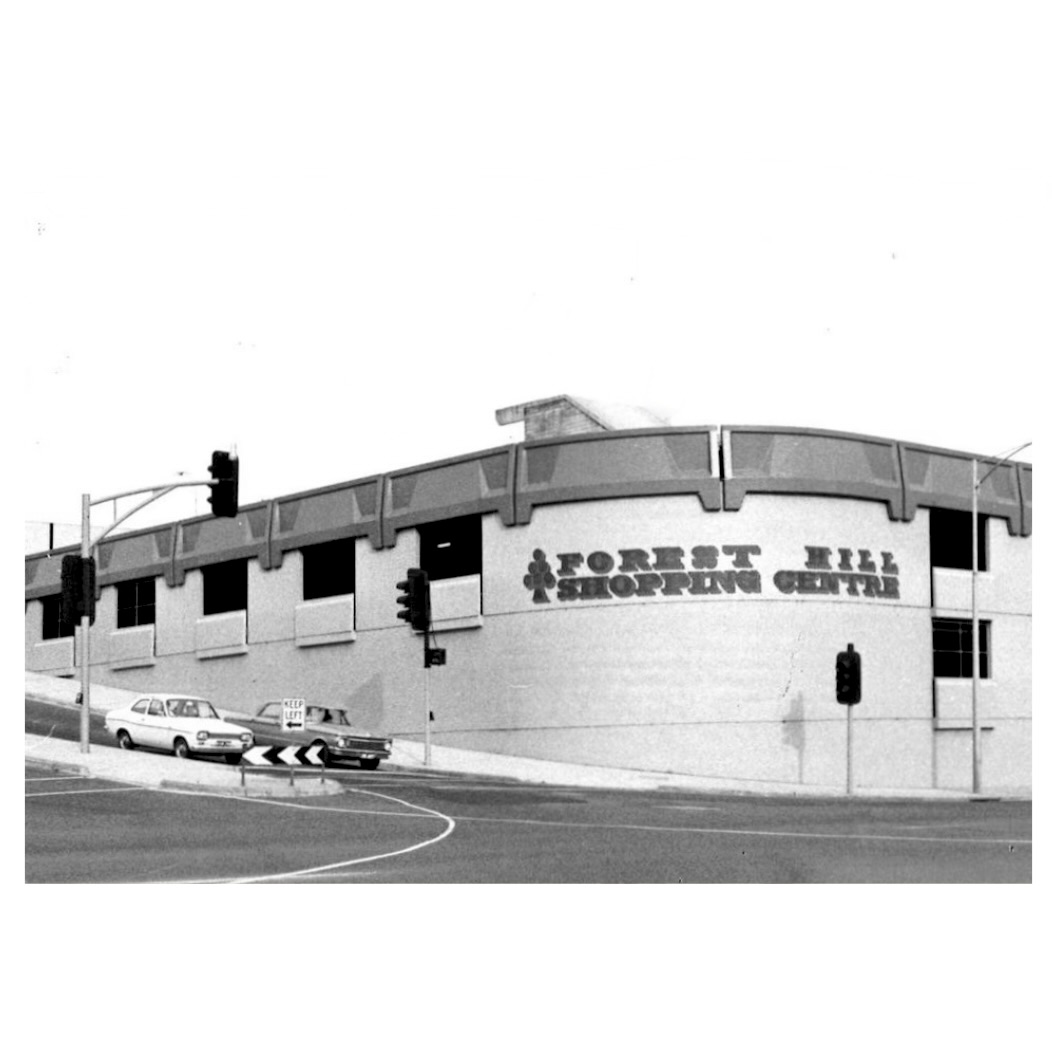
Front car park (1970s)

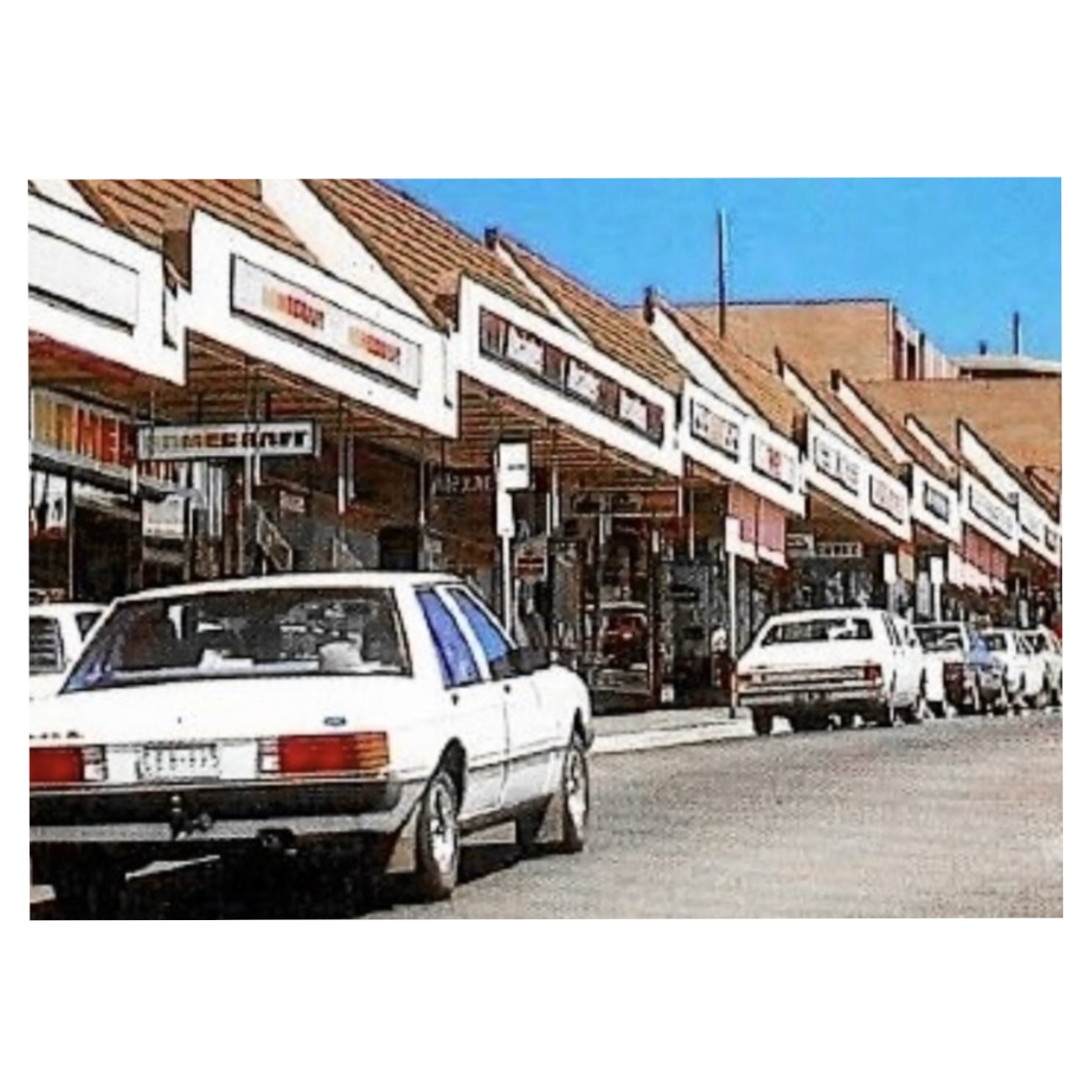
Mahoneys Road (1980s)

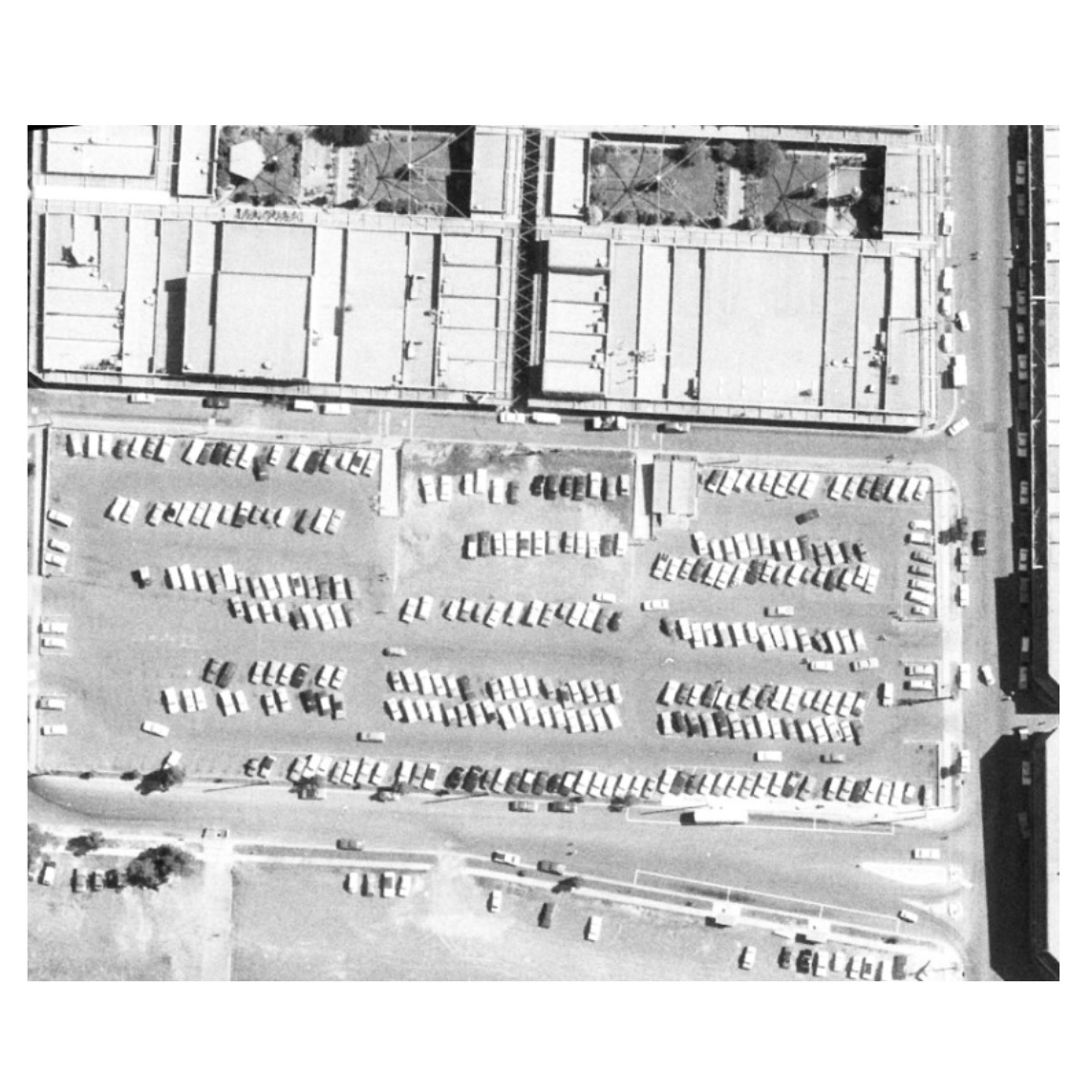
Pre-redevelopment (1975)

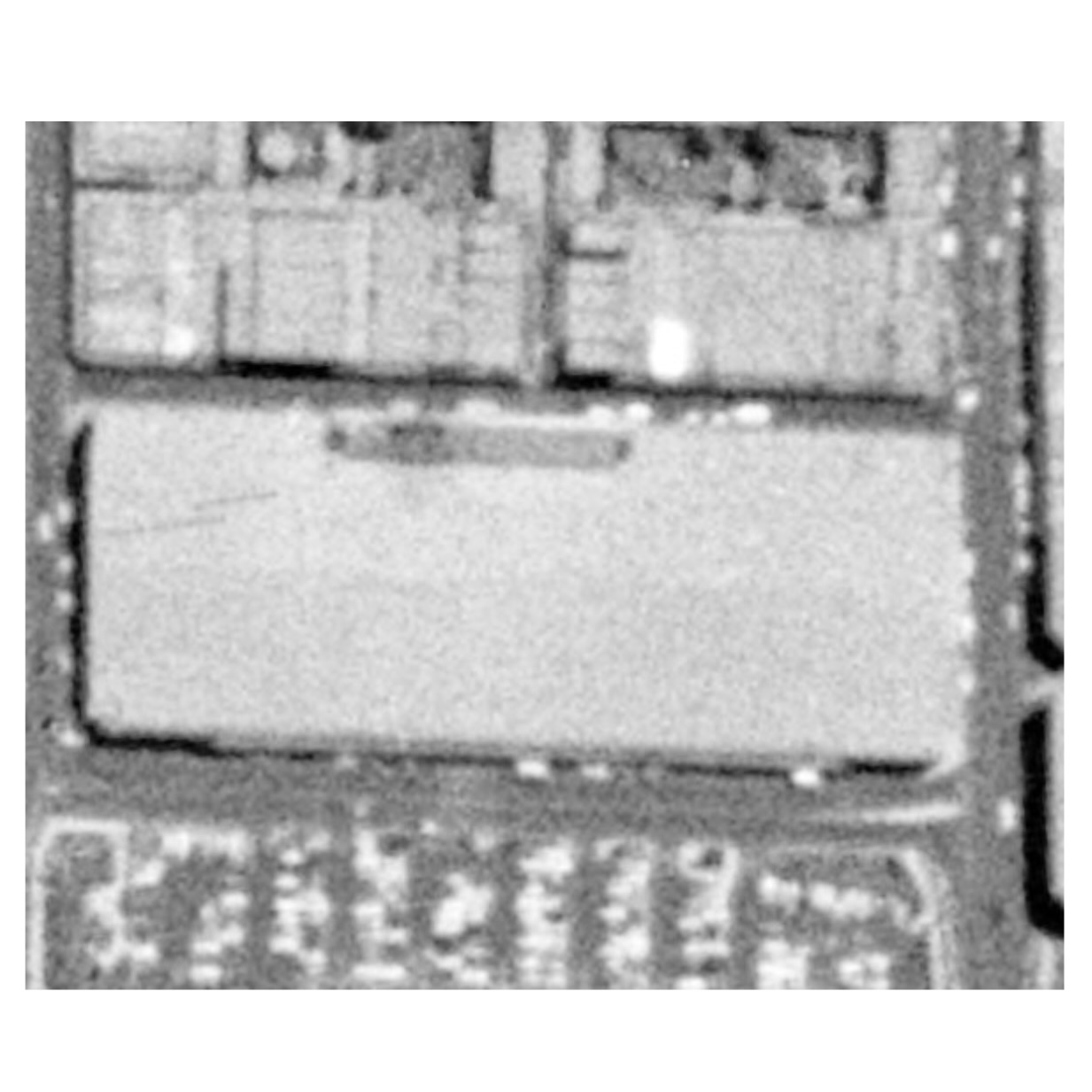
Post-redevelopment (1979)

== Forest Hill Chase redevelopment (1981–90) ==
In 1981, centre management engaged Meldrum Burrows & Partners to conduct a feasibility study into a proposed remodelling and expansion of Forest Hill. A proposed $100 million redevelopment would see replacement of the original centre with a multi-level, indoor mall with 210 tenancies, a 450-seat gourmet food court with an indoor charity fountain and glass elevator, a fresh food market, and parking for about 3000 cars. Architects Buchan, Laird and Bawden, who were chosen to design the redevelopment, took inspiration from the St. Louis Galleria in Missouri.

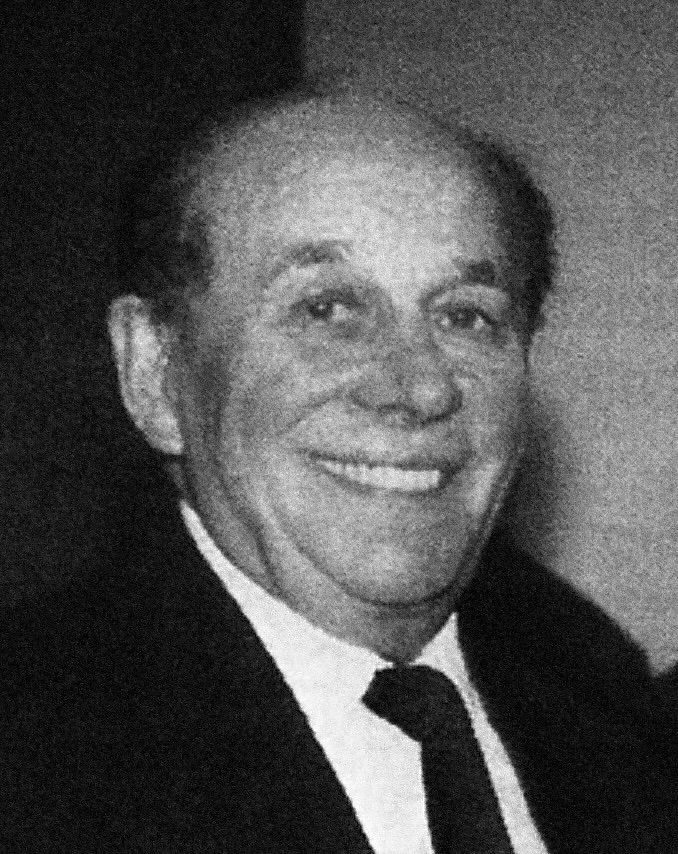
Maurice Alter, 1990s

The two atriums feature large skylights, constructed with polycarbonate and reticulated steel, with a barrel vault shape. The food court originally had a late-19th century French spelter statue of a winged figure holding a clock that stood 2.4 metres high. Council approved the project in mid-1986 and works commenced with the demolition of houses on Flora Grove to free up space for a reconstruction of the car park.

The iconic rocket playground removed to make way for redevelopment of the centre in June 1987. It was subsequently restored by parents of the Syndal South Primary School and erected in the playground of the school where it is still in use today. The old, outdoor shops were demolished in August 1987 except for a row of three stores next to the Mahoneys Road pedestrian entrance, which remain there today. The split-level indoor building was also retained and reconfigured to accommodate new tenants including a multi-level Harris Scarfe store.

The first stage of the expanded centre opened on 12 September 1989, and 113 shops were operating by July 1990. The second stage of the redevelopment was officially completed by December 1990. Fifty-nine shops from the old section were relocated to the new centre. The Hoyts 10 cinema complex opened on the third level on 26 December 1989 with 10 screens and 2,500 seats.

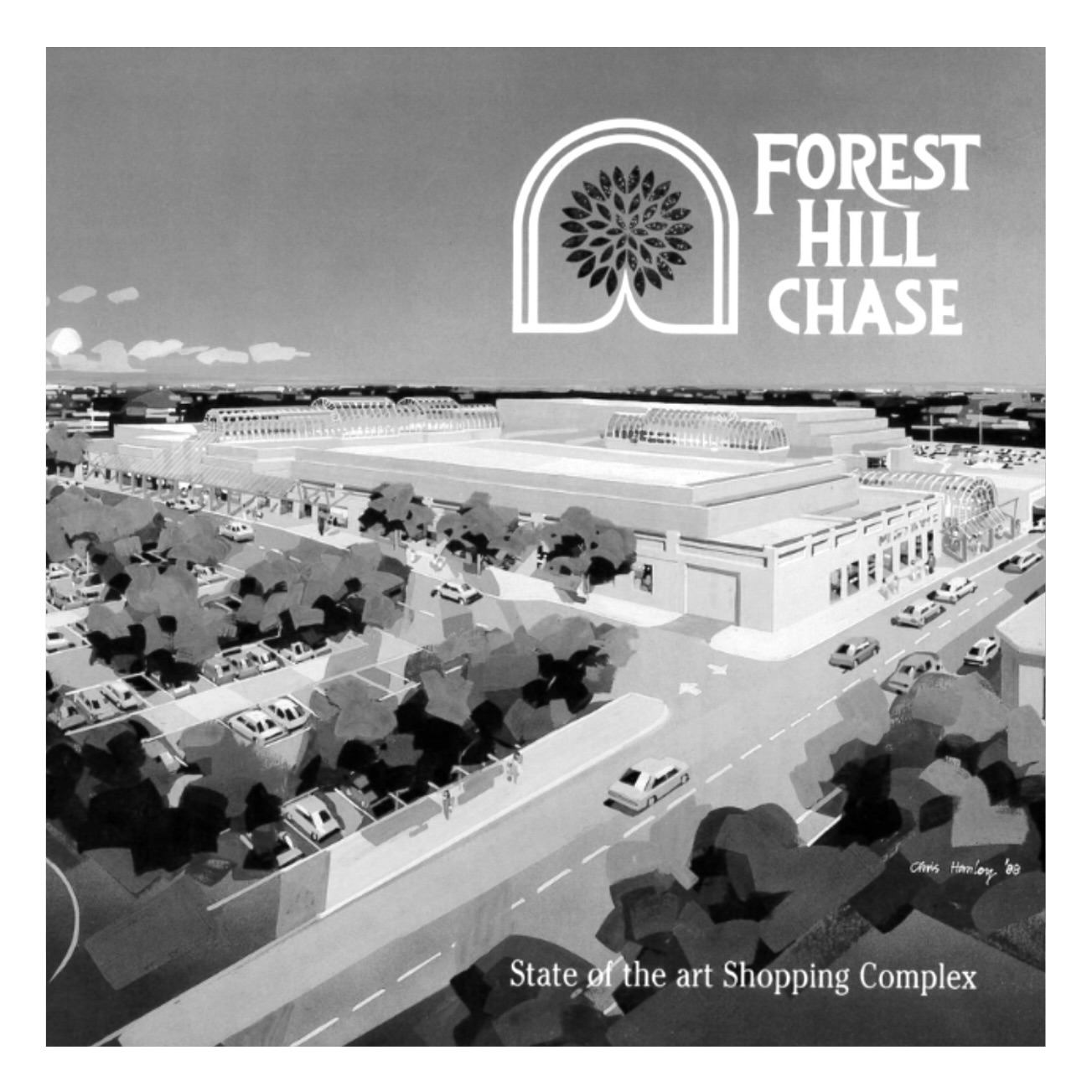
Perspective (1980s)

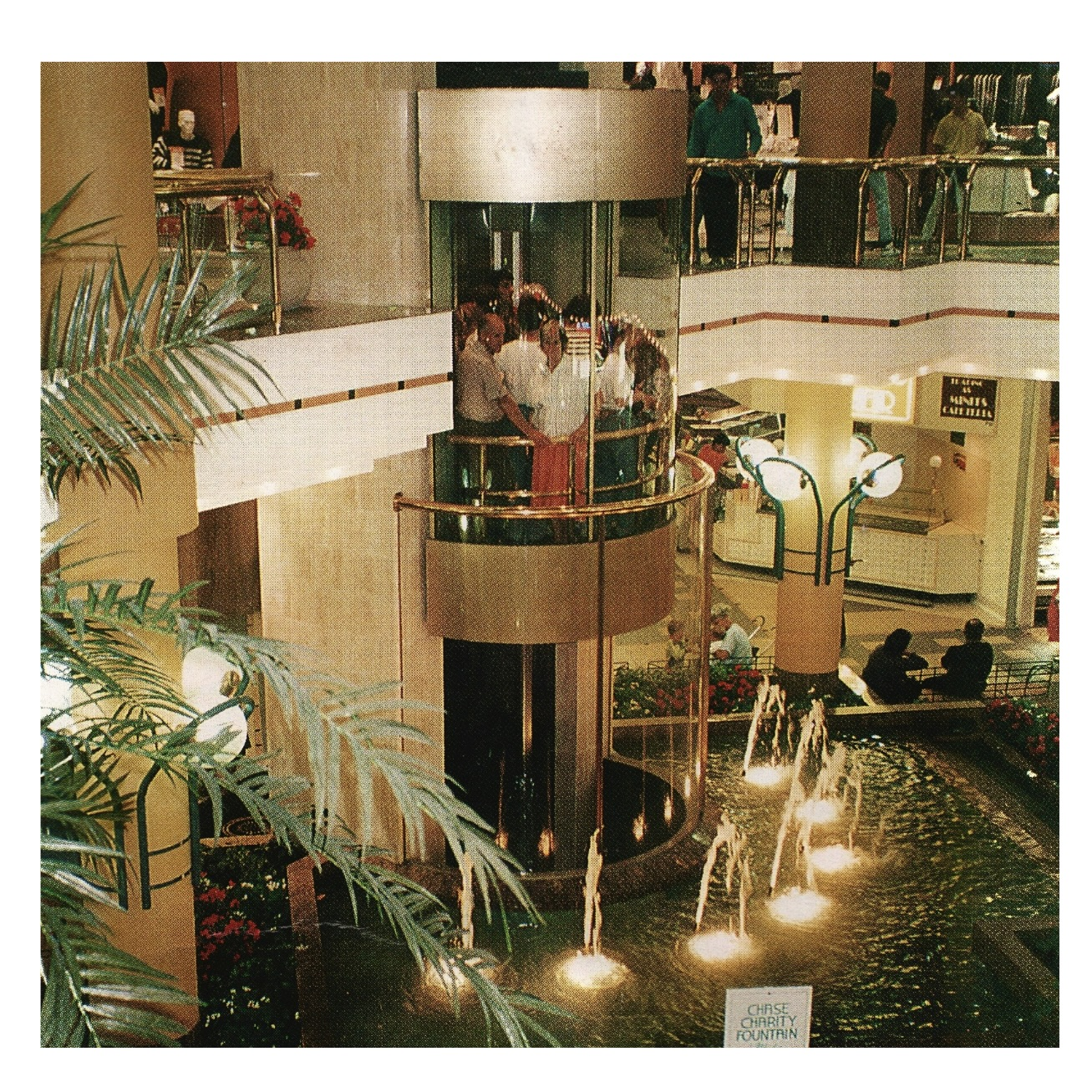
Elevator (1990)

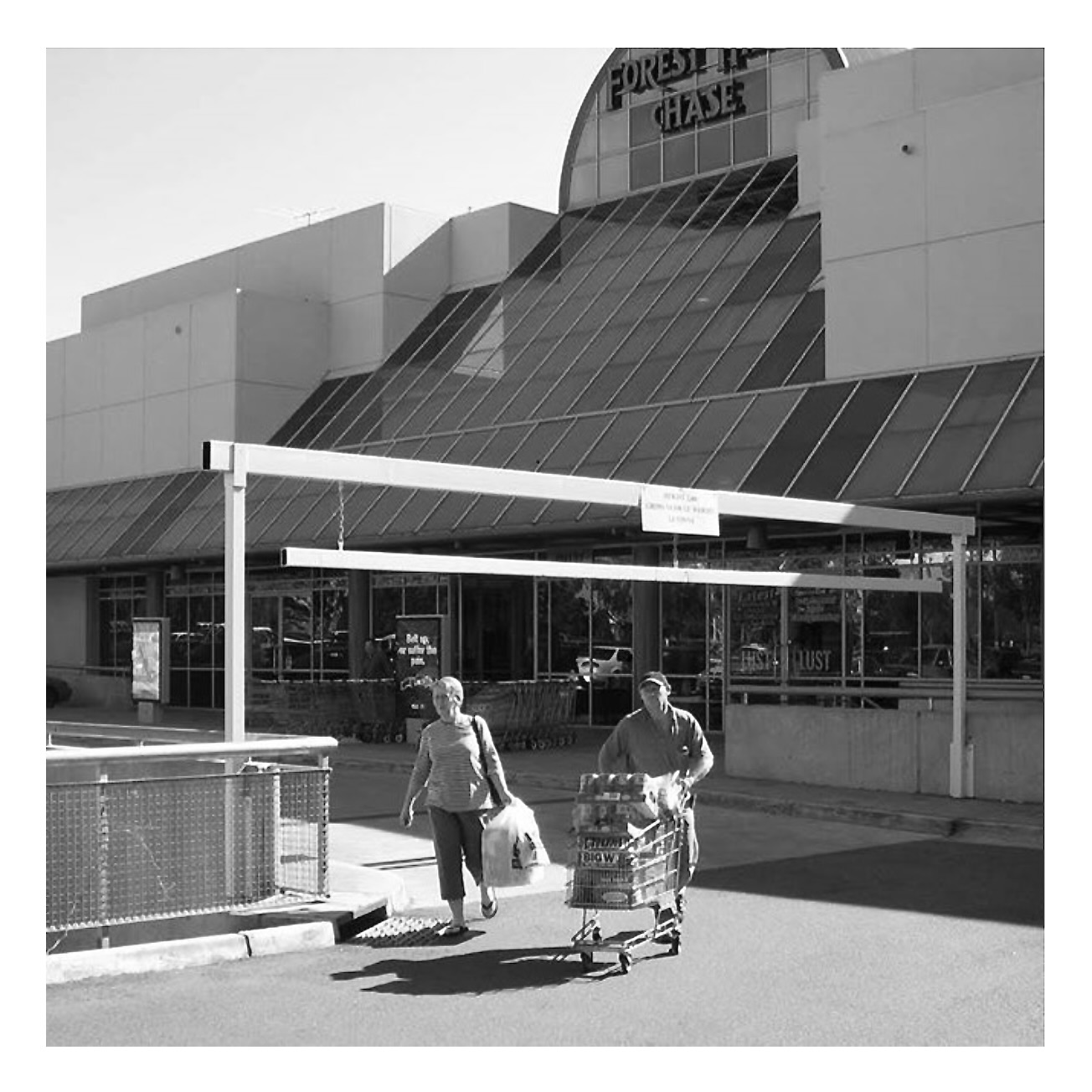
Entrance (1990s)

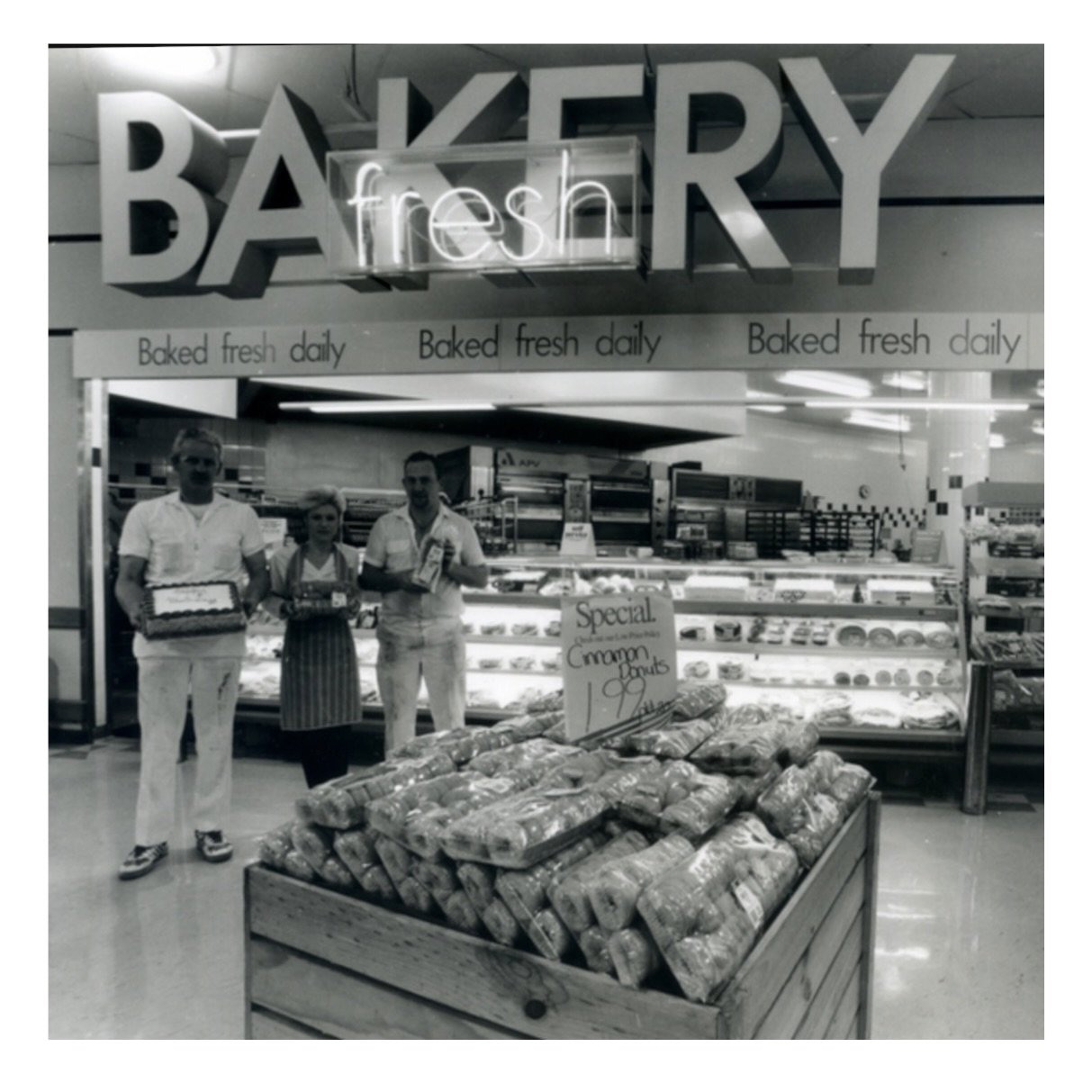
Bakery (1990s)

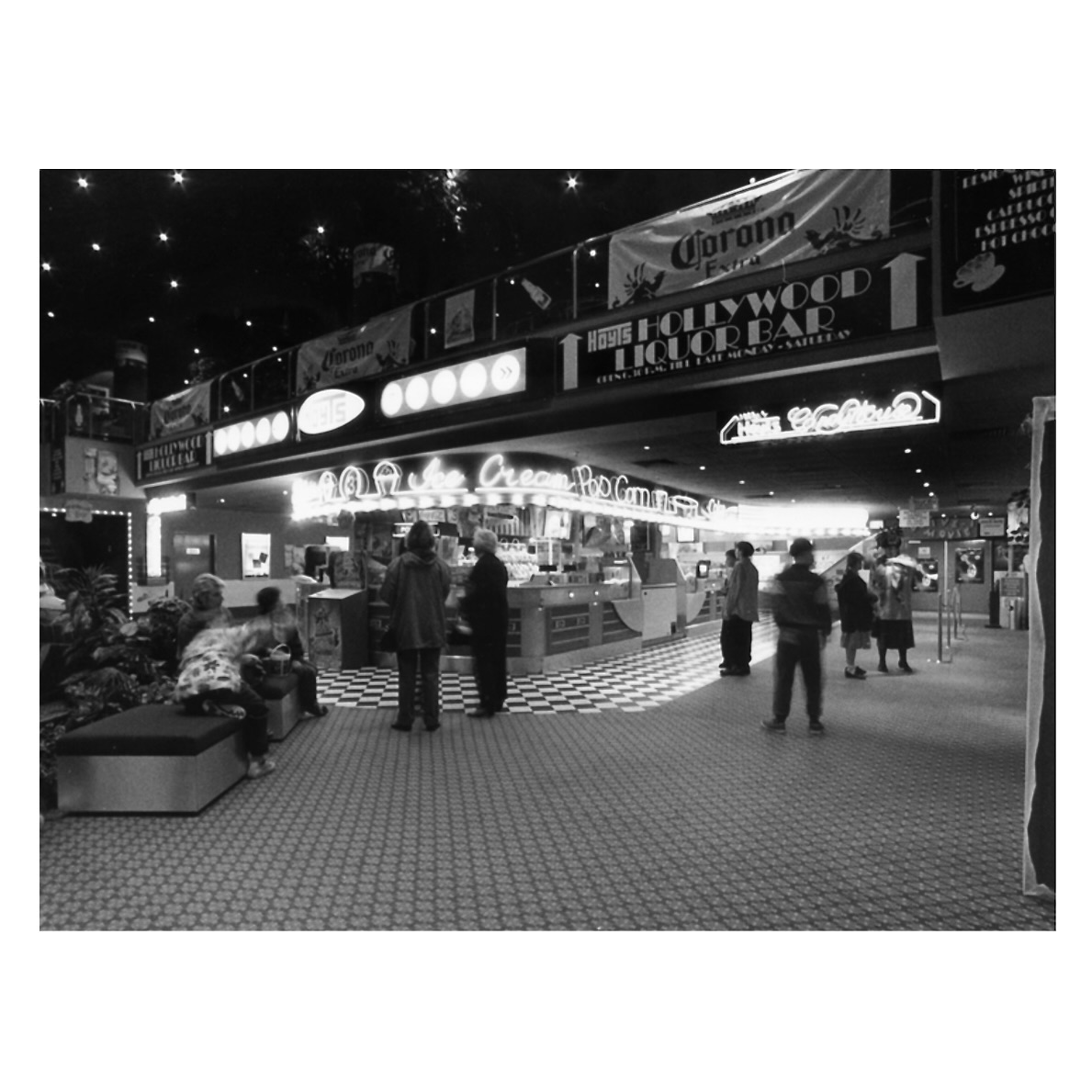
Cinema (1990s)

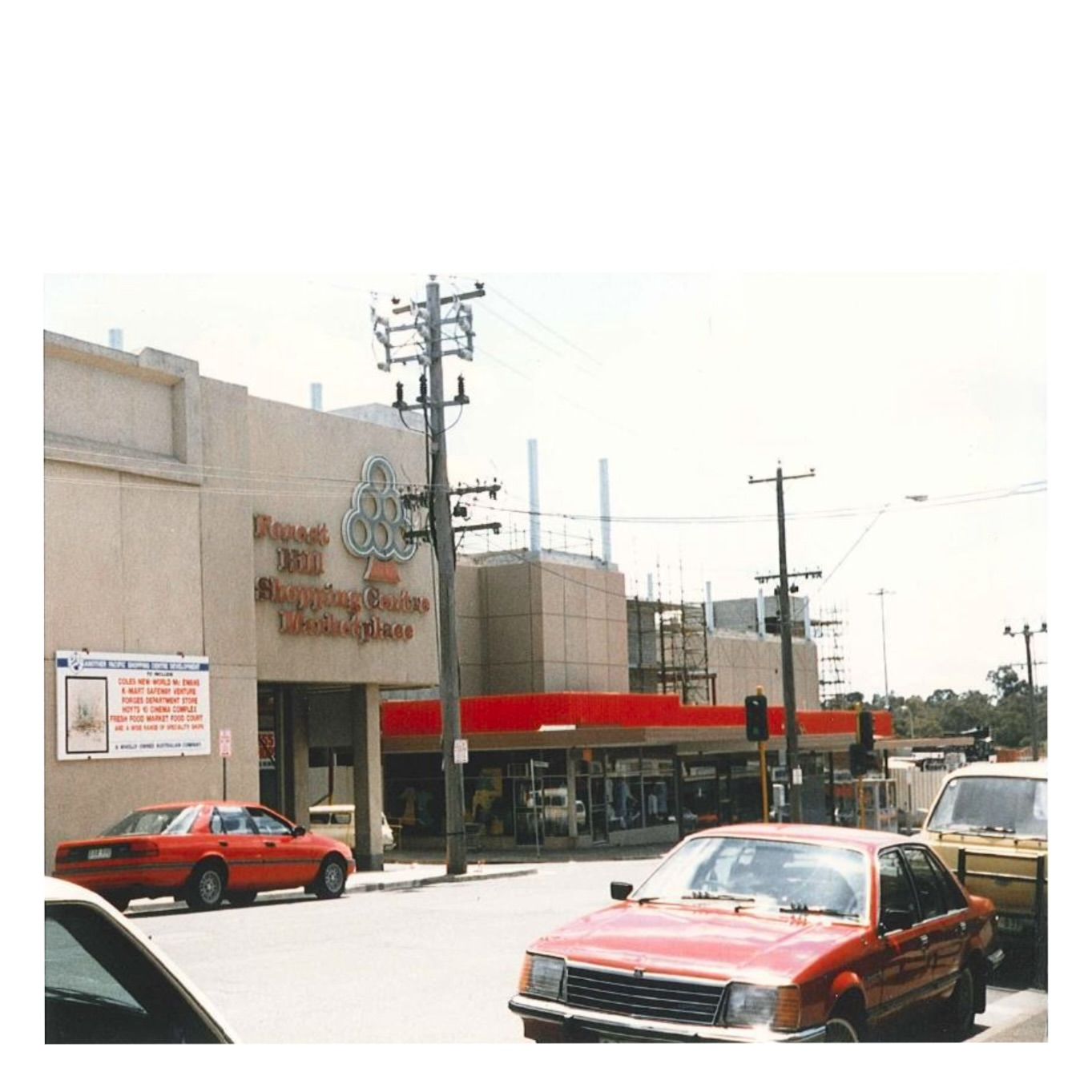
Construction (1988)

== Alterations and additions (1993-2026) ==
The Nunawading Council Community Resource Centre opened on Level 3 around 1993, and housed a range of community groups and councils. In November 1993, Australia's first dedicated, public virtual reality centre opened at Shop 263 (next to present-day TK Maxx tenancy) on the centre's second level. Operated by the Cyberspace corporation, it debuted with Exorex, a robot seek-and-destroy experience. A bar lounge and tavern with 90 gaming machines (later reduced to 50) called Vegas (now Chase Hotel) opened on the centre's third level in early March 1995. The opening was delayed due to several legal disputes and issues obtaining a liquor license.

Around 1997, Harris Scarfe downsized from its two level form to occupying only Level 1, allow a new Big W department store to open in the now vacant space on Level 2. An AMF (now Zone) bowling alley with 28 lanes and children's play centre Run Riot opened on Level 3 around the year 2000.

In the biggest redevelopment of the centre since 1989/1990, levels one and two were completely refurbished in 2007. Kmart Tyre & Auto Service was relocated to a new free standing site in Pacific Way, reopening March 2007. The interior malls on level one and two were refurbished with new floor tiling laid, removal of the traditional gold and marble balustrades with modern steel balustrades installed, and the removal of the stairwells at the south of the centre near Big W. The level two toilets were fully refurbished. The Mahoneys Road entrance was upgraded, with the existing glass canopy replaced and upgraded with a terrace installed on Level 3 for use by the Chase Hotel, which was completed by June 2007.

The centre's Kmart permanently closed on 31 January 2007 and was subsequently converted to Target, which opened in September 2007. The food court was also refurbished and extended around this time. A dance studio began operating out of the former Forest Hill Cinema building on Mahoneys Road in 2012 but would soon close.

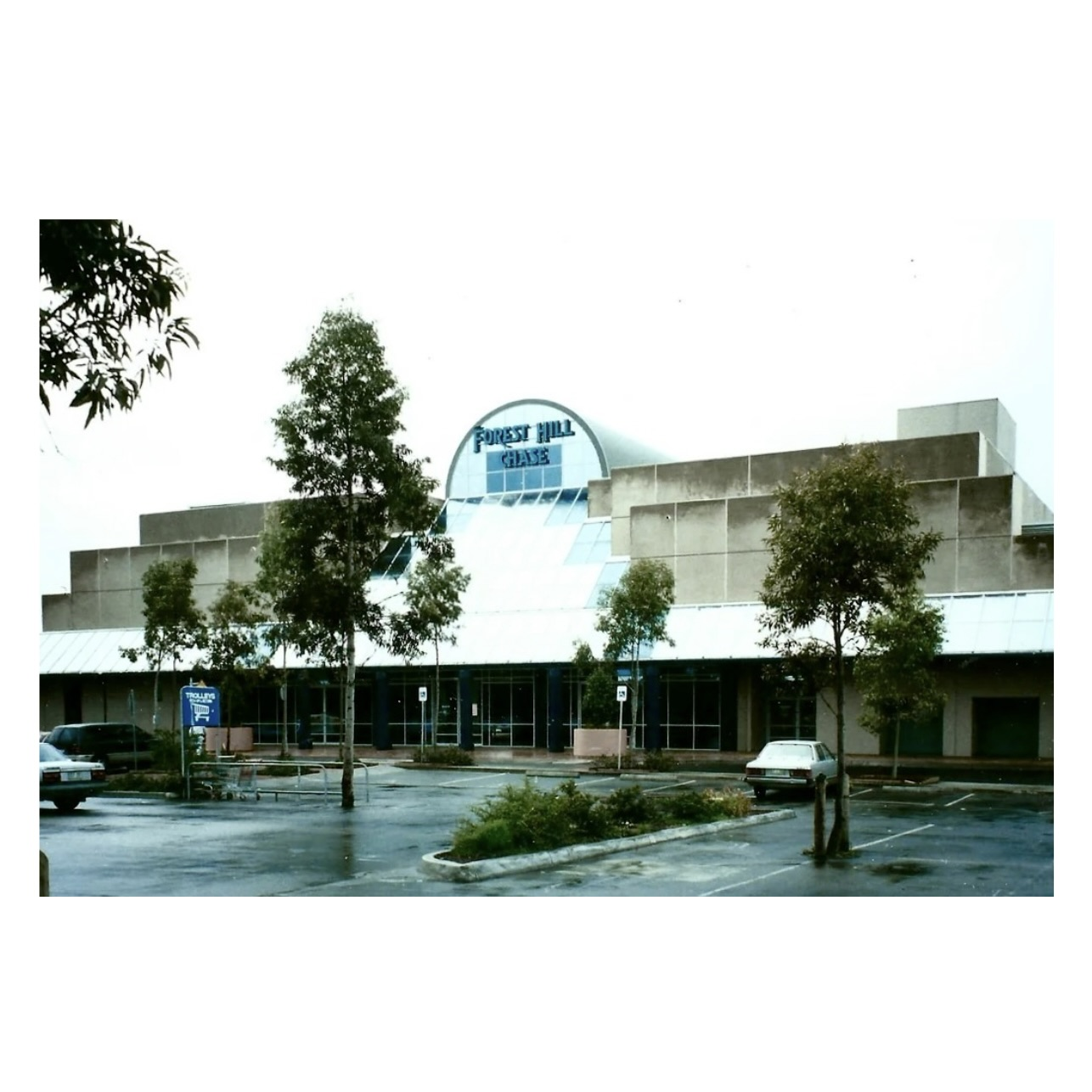
Exterior (1998)

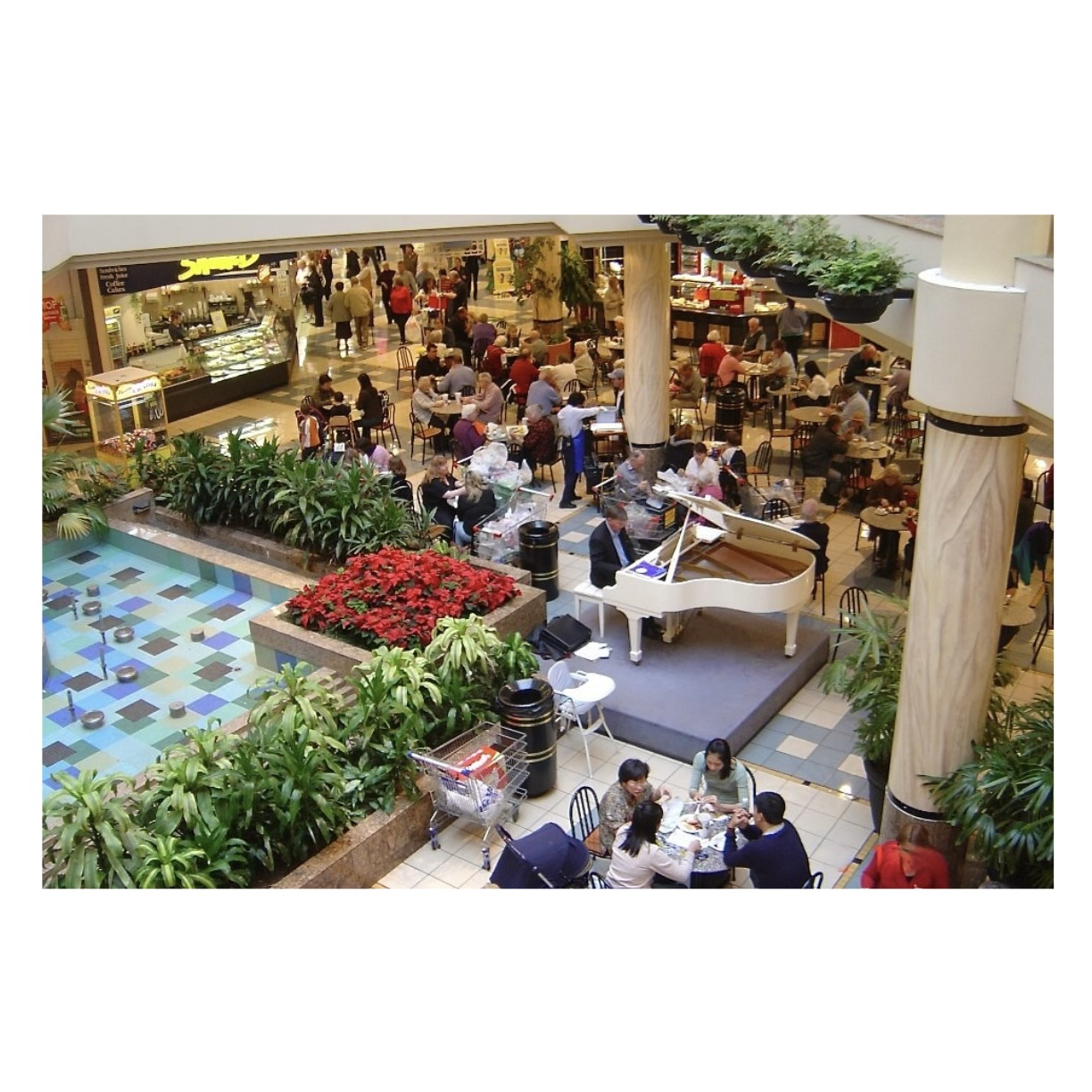
Food court (1990s)

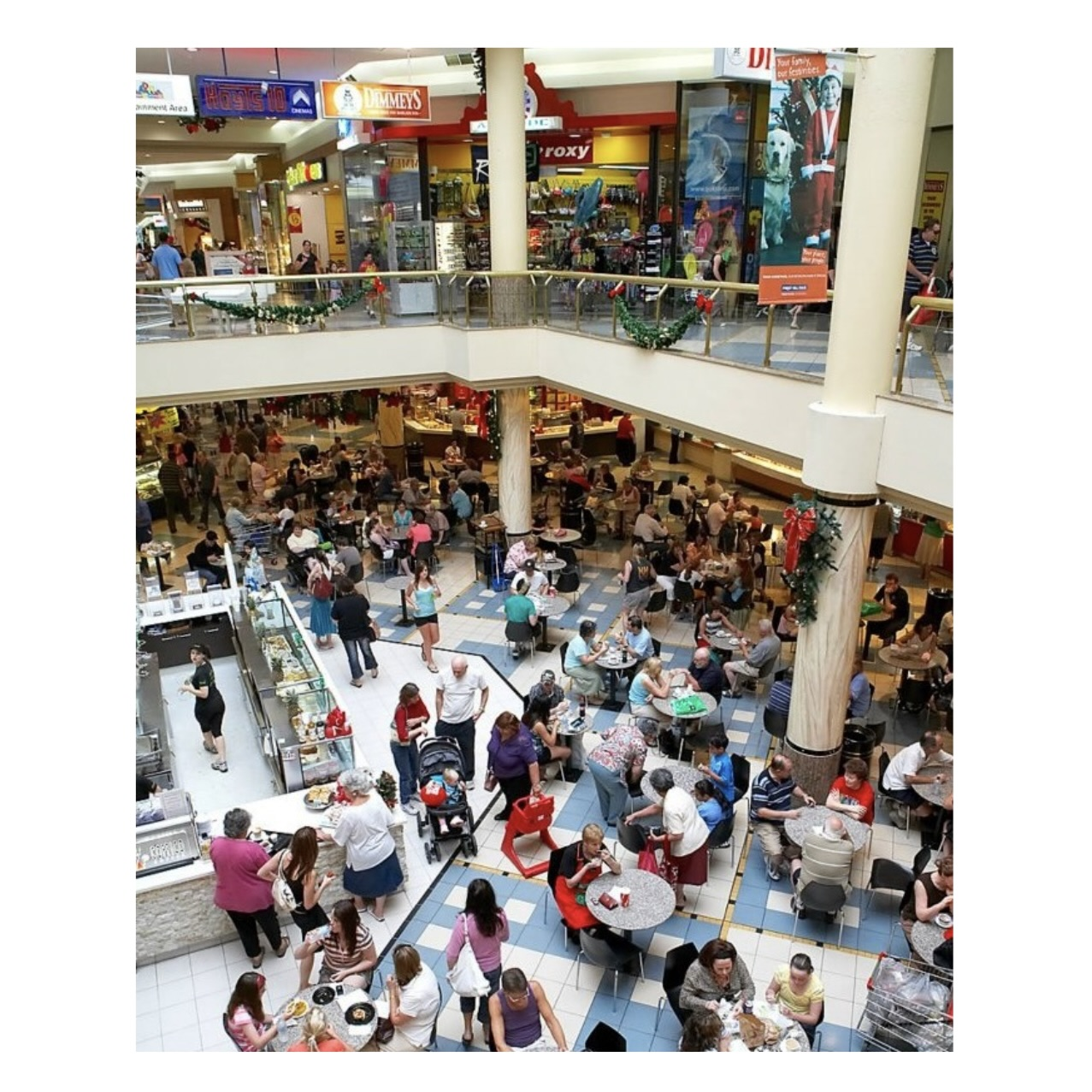
Food court (2005)

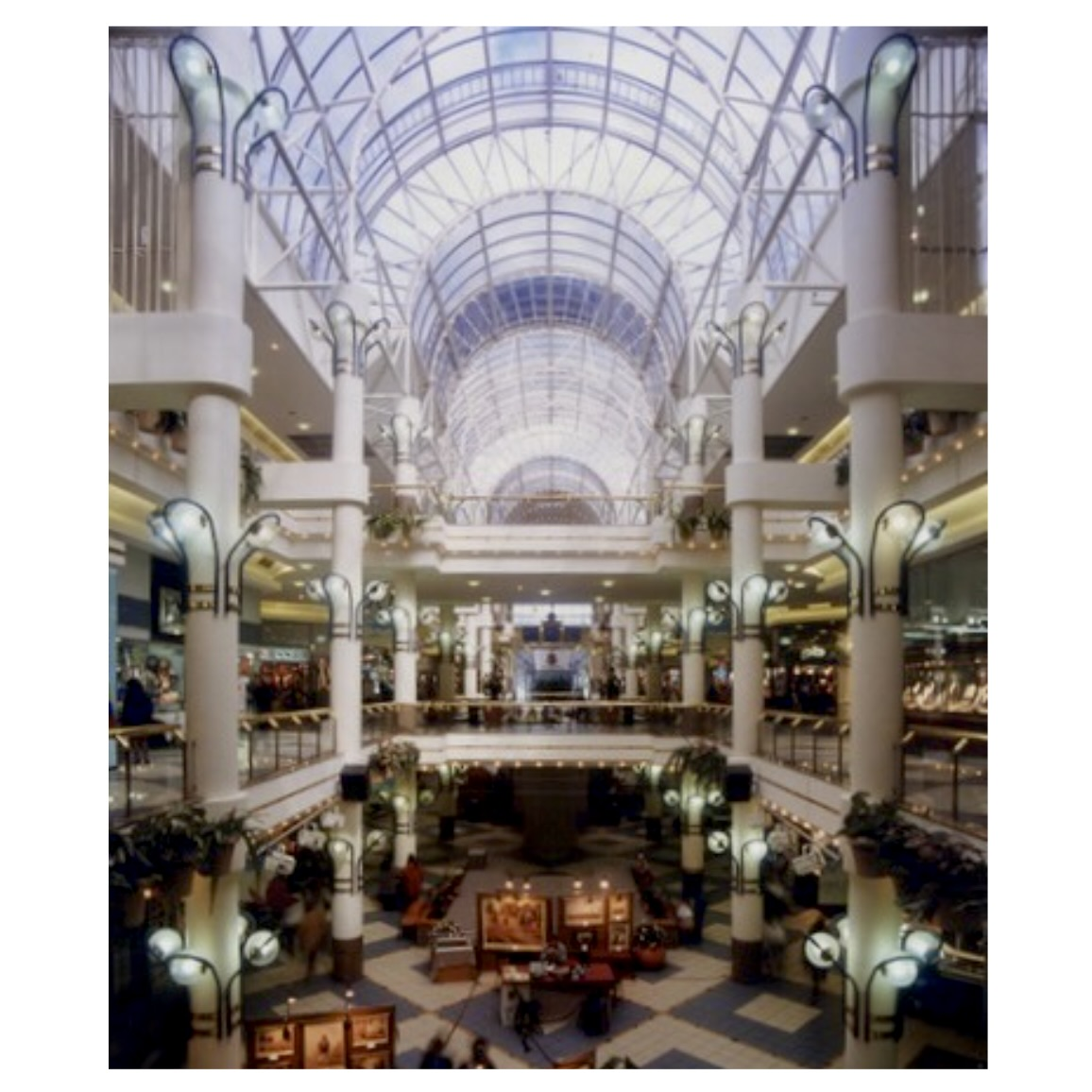
Atrium (1994)

Level 3 was expanded and refurbished during the second half of 2010, complementing the earlier refurbishment of the other levels of the centre and introducing a number of new tenants. Around this time, Pancake Parlour was closed and replaced by TGI Fridays. The refurbishment was completed in December 2010 and included mall and carpark reconfiguration, expansion and renovation, and escalators between levels two and three.

The construction of an additional deck of car parking located west of Hoyts above the existing Target/Coles multi-deck car park, including 317 spaces, opened on 15 December 2010. An updated entertainment and dining precinct with a refurbished Hoyts cinema, three new restaurants as well as new minor anchor retailers JB Hi-Fi, Rebel and gymnasium Fit n Fast was established. The Hoyts Multiplex was closed in July 2010 for a much needed-refurbishment. Four of the cinemas were handed back to the centre and converted into retail space as part of the upgrade and redevelopment of Level 3. The current seating capacities are 161 in cinemas 1, 2, 5 and 6 and 173 in cinemas 3 and 4.

In 2012, Harris Scarfe returned to the centre and spent more than $2 million redeveloping the store in the area previously occupied by Myer. The centre also expanded its fresh food market on level one, which included a new Aldi supermarket on top of the Canterbury Road multi deck car park, which caused a small increase in undercover parking. A new refurbished bus zone was also built as a result. (A temporary bus zone was constructed adjacent to Kmart Tyre & Auto during construction).

In 2013, the glass lift in the food court, which travels from the basement car park through to level 3 was replaced, as the existing lift was too small, causing heavy congestion as it became the only fully accessible way to move between levels 2 and 3 after a past level 3 redevelopment. The expanded lift is now operating and carries up to 26 people. New facade and centre entrance treatments were also installed along the Canterbury Road car park frontage and around the Level 2 Best & Less centre entry.

In late 2017, works began to revamp the third floor and partially renovate the second floor. The east wing of the Level 2 mall, which formerly housed Dimmeys and a few other retailers, was closed down for several months and completely renovated and re-configured. Dimmeys moved to a smaller location near the Level 1 food court (which later closed down permanently) with JB Hi-Fi and Rebel moving from their former Level 3 tenancies. The escalators linking Level 2 and Level 3 were also removed to allow for more retail space.

In 2018, Big W closed down, with a new TK Maxx store occupying part of the available space, with its entrance opposite the newly re-located JB Hi-Fi and Rebel stores. A new Medical Centre and Child Care Centre will occupy the remainder of the space of the former Big W. In 2019, Level 3 was renovated, with the space left behind by JB Hi-Fi and Rebel being converted into more dining retailers, with the whole level getting a refurbishment and being branded as "The Loft". Zone Bowling (formerly AMF) and Timezone were also renovated to combine the two tenancies together with a new look. A new glass lift was also installed near the escalator located outside Woolworths with access to all levels.

In late 2025, Forest Hill unveiled a brand new refurbished food court, removing a section of shops on the first floor to open up the space and make room for new stores. New stores included KFC, Soul Origin, Dumpling Chef, Palong Tea, and Bunn Mee & Pho. The upgrade included new seating, enhanced lighting, and refreshed interiors. New tiling, plants, and seating areas were also introduced across the centre, alongside an updated logo and the repainting of the exterior building.

In mid-2026, Forest Hill Chase opened The Summit Sports Complex, a competition-grade, three-court basketball facility located on Level 3 of the shopping centre. Operated in partnership with Nunawading Basketball, the complex features indoor courts, training facilities, and community recreation spaces, serving as a major sporting and community hub in Melbourne's eastern suburbs.
