= List of acts of the Parliament of Victoria from 1973 =

This is a list of acts of the Parliament of Victoria, Australia for the year 1973.

== 1973 ==
Short title, or popular name	Citation	Royal assent
Long title
Abattoir and Meat Inspection Act 1973	No. 8404	17 April 1973
An Act to establish the Victorian Abattoir and Meat Inspection Authority, to license Abattoirs and for other purposes.
Egg Industry Stabilization Act 1973	No. 8406	17 April 1973
An Act to provide for the Stabilization of the Egg Industry, and for Purposes connected therewith, and to make an Amendment in the Marketing of Primary Products Act 1958. (Note: Marketing of Primary Products Act 1958 (No. 6304))
Recreation Vehicles Act 1973 (repealed)	No. 8407	17 April 1973
An Act to make Provision with respect to the Registration and Insurance of Recreation Vehicles, to control the Use of Vehicles in Public Places and for other purposes. (Repealed by Transport Act 1983 (No. 9921))
Motor Car Traders Act 1973	No. 8408	17 April 1973
An Act to make Provision with respect to the Licensing of Traders in Motor Cars, to regulate Trading in Motor Cars, to amend the Motor Car Act 1958 (Note: Motor Car Act 1958 (No. 6325)) and the Stamps Act 1958, (Note: Stamps Act 1958 (No. 6375)) and for other purposes.
Decentralized Industry (Housing) Act 1973	No. 8409	17 April 1973
An Act to establish a Decentralized Industry Housing Authority, to provide Housing for Persons employed in Country Industries and for other purposes.
Victorian Inland Meat Authority (Amendment) Act 1973 (repealed)	No. 8412	17 April 1973
An Act to amend the Victorian Inland Meat Authority Act 1958. (Note: Victorian Inland Meat Authority Act 1958 (No. 6411)) (Repealed by Victorian Inland Meat Authority Act 1974 (No. 8572)
Ombudsman Act 1973	No. 8414	17 April 1973
An Act to provide for the Appointment in Victoria of an Ombudsman with Power to investigate Administrative Actions taken by or on behalf of Government Departments and other Authorities, and for other purposes.
Public Records Act 1973	No. 8418	17 April 1973
An Act with respect to the Establishment of a Public Record Office and the Preservation, Management and Utilization of the Public Records of the State.
Metric Conversion Act 1973	No. 8423	17 April 1973
An Act to facilitate the Conversion to the Metric System of Measurement of certain References to Physical Quantities.
Social Welfare (Amendment) Act 1973	No. 8426	11 April 1974
An Act to amend the Social Welfare Act 1970, (Note: Social Welfare Act 1970 (No. 8089)) the Crimes Act 1958, (Note: Crimes Act 1958 (No. 6231)) and the Maintenance Act 1965 (Note: Maintenance Act 1965 (No. 7289)) with respect to the Service of Terms of Imprisonment, the Custody and Treatment of Prisoners, Work-release from Prisons, and for other purposes.
Victorian Development Corporation Act 1973 (repealed)	No. 8428	17 April 1973
An Act to constitute a Victorian Development Corporation, to encourage and assist in the Establishment Expansion and Development of certain Industries, and the Provision of Tourist Facilities in the State and for other purposes. (Repealed by Victorian Economic Development Corporation Act 1981 (No. 9574))
Motor Accidents Act 1973	No. 8429	17 April 1973
An Act to establish a Motor Accidents Board, to make Provision for the Payment of certain Compensation to Persons injured and to Relatives of Persons who die as the Result of Motor Accidents, to establish a Motor Accidents Tribunal, to make Provision for the Payment of Amounts to the Motor Accidents Board by certain Persons, to amend the Motor Car Act 1958 and for other purposes.
Motor Car (Amendment) Act 1973	No. 8430	17 April 1973
An Act to amend the Motor Car Act 1958, and for other purposes.
Ministry of Consumer Affairs Act 1973 (repealed)	No. 8442	26 June 1973
An Act to establish a Ministry of Consumer Affairs and for other purposes. (Repealed by Fair Trading Act 1999 (No. 16 of 1999))
Appropriation Act 1973	No. 8449	30 October 1973
An Act to apply a Sum out of the Consolidated Fund to the Service of the Year ending on the Thirtieth Day of June One Thousand Nine Hundred and Seventy-four and to appropriate the Supplies granted in this Session of Parliament and for other purposes.
Motor Car (Fees) Act 1973	No. 8468	7 November 1973
An Act to amend Section 22 of the Motor Car Act 1958 and the Motor Car (Learner Drivers' Permits) Act 1972. (Note: Motor Car (Learner Drivers' Permits) Act 1972 (No. 8345))
Children's Court Act 1973 (repealed)	No. 8477	20 November 1973
An Act to re-enact with Amendments the Law relating to Children's Courts. (Repealed by Children and Young Persons Act 1989 (No. 56 of 1989))
Law Reform Act 1973 (repealed)	No. 8483	27 November 1973
An Act to establish the Office of Law Reform Commissioner, to provide for the Constitution of a Law Reform Advisory Council to assist the Law Reform Commissioner, to amend the Legal Profession Practice Act 1958 (Note: Legal Profession Practice Act 1958 (No. 6291)) and for other purposes. (Repealed by Law Reform Commission Act 1984 (No. 10131))
Small Claims Tribunals Act 1973	No. 8486	27 November 1973
An Act to make Provision for the Constitution and Establishment of Small Claims Tribunals, to confer Jurisdiction thereon with respect to the Determination of Small Claims, and for Purposes connected therewith.
Consumer Protection Act 1973	No. 8488	4 December 1973
An Act to increase the Size of the Consumer Affairs Council, to enable the Director of Consumer Affairs to institute or defend Proceedings on behalf of a Consumer, to prohibit Pyramid Selling, to amend the Consumer Protection Act 1972 (Note: Consumer Protection Act 1972 (No. 8276)) and for other purposes.
Social Welfare Act 1973	No. 8493	4 December 1973
An Act to amend the Social Welfare Act 1970 and the Provisions of the Crimes Act 1958 with respect to Parole.
Monash University (Amendment) Act 1973	No. 8494	4 December 1973
An Act to amend the Monash University Act 1958, (Note: Monash University Act 1958 (No. 6184)) and for other purposes.
Educational Grants Act 1973	No. 8495	4 December 1973
An Act to make Provision with respect to Financial Aid for certain Schools.
Boilers and Pressure Vessels (Amendment) Act 1973	No. 8497	11 December 1973
An Act to amend the Boilers and Pressure Vessels Act 1970, (Note: Boilers and Pressure Vessels Act 1970 (No. 8004)) and for other purposes.
Health (Special Accommodation Houses) Act 1973	No. 8501	11 December 1973
An Act to amend the Health Act 1958 (Note: Health Act 1958 (No. 6270)) with respect to the Registration of Special Accommodation Houses.
Social Welfare (Financial) Act 1973	No. 8504	11 December 1973
An Act to amend the Social Welfare Act 1970 with respect to the Remuneration of certain Persons holding Office thereunder and for other purposes.
Health (Fluoridation) Act 1973	No. 8506	11 December 1973
An Act to regulate the Fluoridation of Public Water Supplies and for other purposes.
Wodonga Area Land Acquisition Act 1973	No. 8518	18 December 1973
An Act to authorize the Acquisition of Land in the Wodonga Area to make Provision with respect to the Compensation payable for Land so acquired and for other purposes.
Albury-Wodonga Agreement Act 1973	No. 8520	18 December 1973
An Act to make Provision with respect to the Growth and Development of the Wodonga Area, the Planning of the Area and the Establishment of the Albury–Wodonga (Victoria) Corporation and for other purposes.
Development Areas Act 1973 (repealed)	No. 8524	18 December 1973
An Act to make Provision with respect to Accelerated or Controlled Development in certain Areas and for other purposes. (Repealed by Docklands Authority (Amendment) Act 1997 (No. 66 of 1997))
Municipalities Assistance Act 1973	No. 8526	18 December 1973
An Act with respect to Financial Assistance to Municipalities in respect of Rates deferred or excused under Section 298 of the Local Government Act 1958. (Note: Local Government Act 1958 (No. 6299))
Abattoir and Meat Inspection (Commencement) Act 1973	No. 8528	18 December 1973
An Act to amend the Abattoir and Meat Inspection Act 1973. (Note: Abattoir and Meat Inspection Act 1973 (No. 8404))
Attorney-General and Chief Secretary (Additional Functions) Act 1973	No.	
Auction Sales (Licence Fees) Act 1973	No.	
Audit (Appointments) Act 1973	No.	
Ballarat (Sovereign Hill) Land Act 1973	No.	
Barley Marketing (Amendment) Act 1973	No.	
Bendigo Aerodrome Act 1973	No.	
Camperdown (Public Park Land) Act 1973	No.	
Cattle Compensation Act 1973	No.	
Co-operative Housing Societies (Amendment) Act 1973	No.	
Coal Mines (Pensions Increase) Act 1973	No.	
Constitutional Convention (Alternate Members) Act 1973	No.	
Country Fire Authority (Amendment) Act 1973	No.	
Country Roads (Amendment) Act 1973	No.	
Crimes (Amendment) Act 1973	No.	
Crimes (Theft) Act 1973 (repealed)	No. 8425	
(Repealed by Statute Law Revision Act 2013 (No. 70 of 2013)
Decentralized Industry (Land Tax Rebates) Incentive Payments Act 1973	No.	
Education (Handicapped Children) Act 1973	No.	
Educational Lands Act 1973	No.	
Entertainments Tax Act 1973	No.	
Estate Agents (Fees) Act 1973	No.	
Flemington Land Act 1973	No.	
Gas and Fuel Corporation (Amalgamations) Act 1973 (repealed)	No. 8464	
(Repealed by Treasury Legislation (Repeal) Act 2005 (No. 73 of 2005))
Gas and Fuel Corporation (Colonial Gas Holdings Limited) Act 1973	No.	
Geelong Harbor Trust (Lands) Act 1973	No.	
Hairdressers Registration (Amendment) Act 1973	No.	
Home Finance (Amendment) Act 1973	No.	
Hospitals and Charities (Amendment) Act 1973	No.	
Hospitals and Charities (Guarantee) Act 1973	No.	
Hospitals and Charities (Institutions and Benevolent Societies) Act 1973	No.	
Hospitals Superannuation (Amendment) Act 1973	No.	
Housing (Commonwealth-State Agreement) Act 1973	No.	
Housing (Sale of Land) Act 1973	No.	
Hungarian Reformed Church of Australia (Victorian District) Incorporation Act 1973	No.	
Joint Select Committee (Meat Industry) Act 1973	No.	
Joint Select Committee (Osteopathy, Chiropractic and Naturopathy) Act 1973	No.	
Joint Select Committee (Osteopathy, Chiropractic and Naturopathy) Amendment Act 1973	No.	
Joint Select Committee (Road Safety) Act 1973	No.	
Judges Salaries and Allowances Act 1973	No.	
Labour and Industry (Amendment) Act 1973	No.	
Land (Metric Conversion) Act 1973	No.	
Land Act 1973	No.	
Land Tax Act 1973	No.	
Lands Compensation Act 1973	No.	
Latrobe Valley (Amendment) Act 1973	No.	
Local Authorities Superannuation (Amendment) Act 1973	No.	
Local Government (House Builders' Liability) Act 1973	No.	
Local Government (Rates) Act 1973	No.	
Local Government (Subdivision of Land) Act 1973	No.	
Magistrates' Courts (Jurisdiction) Act 1973	No.	
Maidstone Land Act 1973	No.	
Margarine Act 1973	No.	
Marketing of Primary Products (Citrus Fruit) Act 1973	No.	
Maryborough Land Act 1973	No.	
Medical Practitioners (Amendment) Act 1973	No.	
Melba Trust Fund Act 1973	No.	
Melbourne Family Care Organization (Amendment) Act 1973	No.	
Melbourne Family Care Organization Act 1973	No.	
Melbourne Underground Rail Loop (Amendment) Act 1973	No.	
Metropolitan Fire Brigades (Amendment) Act 1973	No.	
Mines (Amendment) Act 1973	No.	
Mines (Fees) Act 1973	No.	
Ministry for Planning Act 1973	No.	
Ministry for the Arts (Amendment) Act 1973	No.	
Money Lenders (Advertisements) Act 1973	No.	
Parliamentary Salaries and Allowances Act 1973	No.	
Patriotic Funds (Amendment) Act 1973	No.	
Pay-roll Tax (Amendment) Act 1973	No.	
Pensions Supplementation Act 1973	No.	
Poisons (Fees) Act 1973	No.	
Police Offences (Publications) Act 1973	No.	
Police Regulation (Amendment) Act 1973	No.	
Probate Duty (Amendment) Act 1973	No.	
Public Service (Amendment) Act 1973	No.	
Public Works and Services Act 1973	No.	
Public Works Committee (Attendance Fees) Act 1973	No.	
Public Works Committee Act 1973	No.	
Racing (Amendment) Act 1973	No.	
Racing (Further Amendment) Act 1973	No.	
Railway Works and Services Act 1973	No.	
Revocation and Excision of Crown Reservations Act 1973	No.	
Road Transport Act 1973	No.	
Rosebud Institutions Act 1973	No.	
Sewerage Districts (Amendment) Act 1973	No.	
St. Kilda (Ormond Restaurant) Land Act 1973	No.	
Stamps Act 1973	No.	
State College of Victoria (Staff) Act 1973	No.	
State Electricity Commission (Yallourn Council) Act 1973	No.	
State Forests Works and Services Act 1973	No.	
State Savings Bank (Amendment) Act 1973	No.	
Supply (July to October) Act 1973	No.	
Supply (Supplementary Estimates) Act 1973	No.	
Swan Hill (Railways Land) Act 1973	No.	
Taxation Appeals (Commencement) Act 1973	No.	
Teaching Service (Professional Appointees) Act 1973	No.	
Teaching Service Act 1973	No.	
Constitution Act Amendment (Executive Council) Act 1973	No.	
Constitution Act Amendment (Presiding Officers) Act 1973	No.	
Constitution Act Amendment (Qualifications Joint Select Committee) Act 1973	No.	
Constitution Act Amendment (Qualifications) Act 1973	No.	
Constitution Act Amendment (Responsible Ministers) Act 1973	No.	
Tomato Processing Industry (Uniform Agreement) Act 1973	No.	
Unclaimed Moneys Act 1973	No.	
Valuation of Land (Valuers) Act 1973	No.	
Victoria Institute of Colleges (Amendment) Act 1973	No.	
Victorian Development Corporation (Amendment) Act 1973	No.	
Volunteer Civil Defence Workers Compensation (Amendment) Act 1973	No.	
Water (Amendment) Act 1973	No.	
Water (Further Amendment) Act 1973	No.	
Water Supply Works and Services Act 1973 (repealed)	No. 8498	
(Repealed by Treasury Legislation (Repeal) Act 2005 (No. 73 of 2005))
Weights and Measures (Amendment) Act 1973	No.	
Wheat Industry Stabilization (Amendment) Act 1973	No.	
Workers Compensation Act 1973	No.	
Youth, Sport and Recreation (State School Premises) Act 1973	No.	
Zoological Gardens (Amendment) Act 1973	No.	

== Sources ==
- "1973 Victorian Historical Acts". AustLII.
