= List of acts of the Parliament of Victoria from 2003 =

This is a list of acts of the Parliament of Victoria, Australia for the year 2003.

== 2003 ==
Short title, or popular name	Citation	Royal assent
Long title
Public Holidays and Shop Trading Reform Acts (Amendment) Act 2003 (repealed)	No. 1 of 2003	2 April 2003
An Act to amend the Public Holidays Act 1993 (Note: Public Holidays Act 1993 (No. 119 of 1993)) to appoint Easter Saturday as a public holiday and to amend the Shop Trading Reform Act 1996 (Note: Shop Trading Reform Act 1996 (No. 38 of 1996)) to generally require that shops be closed on Easter Sunday and for other purposes. (Repealed by Statute Law (Further Revision) Act 2006 (No. 29 of 2006))
Constitution (Parliamentary Reform) Act 2003	No. 2 of 2003	8 April 2003
An Act to reform the Parliament of Victoria, to amend the Constitution Act 1975 (Note: Constitution Act 1975 (No. 8750)) and the Electoral Act 2002, (Note: Electoral Act 2002 (No. 23 of 2002)) to consequentially amend certain Acts and for other purposes.
Parliamentary Committees and Parliamentary Salaries and Superannuation Acts (Amendment) Act 2003 (repealed)	No. 3 of 2003	15 April 2003
An Act to amend the Parliamentary Committees Act 1968 (Note: Parliamentary Committees Act 1968 (No. 7727)) and the Parliamentary Salaries and Superannuation Act 1968 (Note: Parliamentary Salaries and Superannuation Act 1968 (No. 7723)) and for other purposes. (Repealed by Statute Law (Further Revision) Act 2006 (No. 29 of 2006))
Retail Leases Act 2003	No. 4 of 2003	15 April 2003
An Act to provide a new regulatory scheme for retail leases, to amend and repeal the Retail Tenancies Reform Act 1998, (Note: Retail Tenancies Reform Act 1998 (No. 14 of 1998)) to amend the Retail Tenancies Act 1986 (Note: Retail Tenancies Act 1986 (No. 106 of 1986)) and make minor amendments to certain other Acts and for other purposes.
Shop Trading Reform (Essential Goods Amendment) Act 2003 (repealed)	No. 5 of 2003	15 April 2003
An Act to amend the Shop Trading Reform Act 1996 with respect to trading by certain shops and for other purposes. (Repealed by Statute Law (Further Revision) Act 2006 (No. 29 of 2006))
Small Business Commissioner Act 2003	No. 6 of 2003	15 April 2003
An Act to establish the office of the Small Business Commissioner and to amend the Liquor Control Reform Act 1998 (Note: Liquor Control Reform Act 1998 (No. 94 of 1998)) and the Victorian Civil and Administrative Tribunal Act 1998 (Note: Victorian Civil and Administrative Tribunal Act 1998 (No. 53 of 1998)) and for other purposes.
Terrorism (Community Protection) Act 2003	No. 7 of 2003	15 April 2003
An Act to provide for the prevention of and response to terrorist acts, to amend the Freedom of Information Act 1982 (Note: Freedom of Information Act 1982 (No. 9859)) and the Victorian Civil and Administrative Tribunal Act 1998 and for other purposes.
Business Licensing Legislation (Amendment) Act 2003 (repealed)	No. 8 of 2003	
(Repealed by Statute Law (Further Revision) Act 2006 (No. 29 of 2006))
Control of Weapons and Firearms Acts (Search Powers) Act 2003 (repealed)	No. 9 of 2003	
(Repealed by Statute Law (Further Revision) Act 2006 (No. 29 of 2006))
Crimes (Property Damage and Computer Offences) Act 2003 (repealed)	No. 10 of 2003	
(Repealed by Statute Law (Further Revision) Act 2006 (No. 29 of 2006))
Health Legislation (Research Involving Human Embryos and Prohibition of Human Cloning) Act 2003	No. 11 of 2003	
Pay-roll Tax (Maternity and Adoption Leave Exemption) Act 2003 (repealed)	No. 12 of 2003	
(Repealed by Statute Law (Further Revision) Act 2006 (No. 29 of 2006))
Sentencing (Amendment) Act 2003 (repealed)	No. 13 of 2003	
(Repealed by Statute Law (Further Revision) Act 2006 (No. 29 of 2006))
Terrorism (Commonwealth Powers) Act 2003	No. 14 of 2003	
Commissioner for Environmental Sustainability Act 2003	No. 15 of 2003	13 May 2003
An Act to provide for a Commissioner for Environmental Sustainability, to facilitate a periodical Report on the State of the Environment of Victoria and annual reporting on the implementation of environmental management systems, to consequentially amend the Public Sector Management and Employment Act 1998 (Note: Public Sector Management and Employment Act 1998 (No. 45 of 1998)) and for other purposes.
Commonwealth Games Arrangements (Amendment) Act 2003	No. 16 of 2003	
Country Fire Authority (Volunteer Protection and Community Safety) Act 2003 (repealed)	No. 17 of 2003	
(Repealed by Statute Law (Further Revision) Act 2006 (No. 29 of 2006))
Federal Awards (Uniform System) Act 2003 (repealed)	No. 18 of 2003	13 May 2003
An Act to amend the Commonwealth Powers (Industrial Relations) Act 1996 (Note: Commonwealth Powers (Industrial Relations) Act 1996 (No. 59 of 1996)) to refer to the Parliament of the Commonwealth a further matter relating to industrial relations, to empower the Victorian Civil and Administrative Tribunal to make orders applying federal award conditions as common rules in Victoria and for this purpose to amend the Victorian Civil and Administrative Tribunal Act 1998 and for other purposes. (Repealed by Legislation Reform (Repeals No. 3) Act 2008 (No. 53 of 2008))
Major Events (Crowd Management) Act 2003	No. 19 of 2003	13 May 2003
An Act to promote the safety and enjoyment of participants and spectators at certain venues and major events and for other purposes.
Melbourne Cricket Ground (Amendment) Act 2003 (repealed)	No. 20 of 2003	
(Repealed by Statute Law (Further Revision) Act 2006 (No. 29 of 2006))
Murray-Darling Basin (Amendment) Act 2003 (repealed)	No. 21 of 2003	
(Repealed by Statute Law (Further Revision) Act 2006 (No. 29 of 2006))
Outworkers (Improved Protection) Act 2003	No. 22 of 2003	13 May 2003
An Act to improve the protection of outworkers in the clothing industry, to establish an Ethical Clothing Trades Council of Victoria and for other purposes.
Port Services (Port of Melbourne Reform) Act 2003	No. 23 of 2003	
Seafood Safety Act 2003	No. 24 of 2003	13 May 2003
An Act to regulate the safety of seafood, to make related amendments to the Meat Industry Act 1993, (Note: Meat Industry Act 1993 (No. 40 of 1993)) to amend the Dairy Act 2000, (Note: Dairy Act 2000 (No. 37 of 2000)) the Food Act 1984 (Note: Food Act 1984 (No. 10082)) and the Fisheries Act 1995 (Note: Fisheries Act 1995 (No. 92 of 1995)) and for other purposes.
Southern and Eastern Integrated Transport Authority Act 2003 (repealed)	No. 25 of 2003	13 May 2003
An Act to establish the Southern and Eastern Integrated Transport Authority, to amend the Borrowing and Investment Powers Act 1987 (Note: Borrowing and Investment Powers Act 1987 (No. 13 of 1987)) and for other purposes. (Repealed by Transport Integration Act 2010 (No. 6 of 2010))
University Acts (Amendment) Act 2003 (repealed)	No. 26 of 2003	
(Repealed by Statute Law (Further Revision) Act 2006 (No. 29 of 2006))
Vocational Education and Training (TAFE Qualifications) Act 2003 (repealed)	No. 27 of 2003	
(Repealed by Statute Law (Further Revision) Act 2006 (No. 29 of 2006))
Firearms (Trafficking and Handgun Control) Act 2003 (repealed)	No. 28 of 2003	
(Repealed by Statute Law (Further Revision) Act 2006 (No. 29 of 2006))
Dandenong Development Board Act 2003	No. 29 of 2003	
Fair Trading (Amendment) Act 2003 (repealed)	No. 30 of 2003	
(Repealed by Statute Law (Further Revision) Act 2006 (No. 29 of 2006))
Melbourne (Flinders Street Land) Act 2003	No. 31 of 2003	
Regional Infrastructure Development Fund (Amendment) Act 2003 (repealed)	No. 32 of 2003	
(Repealed by Statute Law (Further Revision) Act 2006 (No. 29 of 2006))
Summary Offences (Offensive Behaviour) Act 2003 (repealed)	No. 33 of 2003	
(Repealed by Statute Law (Further Revision) Act 2006 (No. 29 of 2006))
Transport (Miscellaneous Amendments) Act 2003 (repealed)	No. 34 of 2003	
(Repealed by Statute Law (Further Revision) Act 2006 (No. 29 of 2006))
Water (Victorian Water Trust Advisory Council) Act 2003 (repealed)	No. 35 of 2003	
(Repealed by Statute Law (Further Revision) Act 2006 (No. 29 of 2006))
Audit (Amendment) Act 2003 (repealed)	No. 36 of 2003	
(Repealed by Statute Law (Further Revision) Act 2006 (No. 29 of 2006))
Constitution (Water Authorities) Act 2003 (repealed)	No. 37 of 2003	
(Repealed by Statute Law (Further Revision) Act 2006 (No. 29 of 2006))
Corrections (Amendment) Act 2003 (repealed)	No. 38 of 2003	
(Repealed by Statute Law (Further Revision) Act 2006 (No. 29 of 2006))
Courts Legislation (Amendment) Act 2003 (repealed)	No. 39 of 2003	
(Repealed by Statute Law (Further Revision) Act 2006 (No. 29 of 2006))
Energy Legislation (Consumer Protection and Other Amendments) Act 2003	No. 40 of 2003	
Estate Agents and Sale of Land Acts (Amendment) Act 2003 (repealed)	No. 41 of 2003	
(Repealed by Statute Law (Further Revision) Act 2006 (No. 29 of 2006))
Legal Practice (Validations) Act 2003 (repealed)	No. 42 of 2003	
(Repealed by Statute Law (Further Revision) Act 2006 (No. 29 of 2006))
Planning and Environment (Metropolitan Green Wedge Protection) Act 2003 (repealed)	No. 43 of 2003	
(Repealed by Statute Law (Further Revision) Act 2006 (No. 29 of 2006))
Road Safety (Heavy Vehicle Safety) Act 2003 (repealed)	No. 44 of 2003	
(Repealed by Statute Law (Further Revision) Act 2006 (No. 29 of 2006))
Royal Agricultural Showgrounds Act 2003	No. 45 of 2003	
Safe Drinking Water Act 2003	No. 46 of 2003	
Victims of Crime Assistance (Miscellaneous Amendments) Act 2003 (repealed)	No. 47 of 2003	
(Repealed by Statute Law (Further Revision) Act 2006 (No. 29 of 2006))
Water Legislation (Essential Services Commission and Other Amendments) Act 2003 (repealed)	No. 48 of 2003	
(Repealed by Statute Law (Further Revision) Act 2006 (No. 29 of 2006))
Appropriation (2003/2004) Act 2003	No. 49 of 2003	
Appropriation (Parliament 2003/2004) Act 2003	No. 50 of 2003	
Attorney-General and Solicitor-General (Amendment) Act 2003 (repealed)	No. 51 of 2003	
(Repealed by Statute Law (Further Revision) Act 2006 (No. 29 of 2006))
Australian Crime Commission (State Provisions) Act 2003	No. 52 of 2003	16 June 2003
An Act to make provision for the operation of the Australian Crime Commission in Victoria, to repeal the National Crime Authority (State Provisions) Act 1984, (Note: National Crime Authority (State Provisions) Act 1984 (No. 10157)) to make consequential amendments to various Acts and for other purposes.
Corrections and Sentencing Acts (Home Detention) Act 2003	No. 53 of 2003	16 June 2003
Crimes (Family Violence) (Amendment) Act 2003 (repealed)	No. 54 of 2003	16 June 2003
(Repealed by Statute Law (Further Revision) Act 2006 (No. 29 of 2006))
Drugs, Poisons and Controlled Substances (Volatile Substances) Act 2003	No. 55 of 2003	16 June 2003
Fisheries (Amendment) Act 2003 (repealed)	No. 56 of 2003	16 June 2003
(Repealed by Statute Law (Further Revision) Act 2006 (No. 29 of 2006))
Livestock Disease Control (Amendment) Act 2003 (repealed)	No. 57 of 2003	16 June 2003
(Repealed by Statute Law (Further Revision) Act 2006 (No. 29 of 2006))
State Taxation Acts (Miscellaneous Amendments) Act 2003 (repealed)	No. 58 of 2003	16 June 2003
(Repealed by Statute Law (Further Revision) Act 2006 (No. 29 of 2006))
Victorian Urban Development Authority Act 2003 or the Urban Renewal Authority Victoria Act 2003 or the Development Victoria Act 2003	No. 59 of 2003	16 June 2003
An Act to establish the Victorian Urban Development Authority to carry out urban development, develop the docklands area and undertake declared projects, to provide for special powers in relation to declared projects, to repeal the Urban and Regional Land Corporation Act 1997, (Note: Urban Land Corporation Act 1997 (No. 71 of 1997)) to amend the Docklands Authority Act 1991 (Note: Docklands Authority Act 1991 (No. 22 of 1991)) and other Acts and for other purposes.
Wrongs and Limitation of Actions Acts (Insurance Reform) Act 2003 (repealed)	No. 60 of 2003	
(Repealed by Statute Law (Further Revision) Act 2006 (No. 29 of 2006))
Catchment and Land Protection (Amendment) Act 2003 (repealed)	No. 61 of 2003	
(Repealed by Statute Law (Further Revision) Act 2006 (No. 29 of 2006))
Albury-Wodonga Agreement (Repeal) Act 2003	No. 62 of 2003	23 September 2003
An Act to repeal the Albury-Wodonga Agreement Act 1973 (Note: Albury-Wodonga Agreement Act 1973 (No. 8520)) and the Wodonga Area Land Acquisition Act 1973, (Note: Wodonga Area Land Acquisition Act 1973 (No. 8518)) to dissolve the Albury-Wodonga (Victoria) Corporation, to provide for the transfer of assets, contractual rights and obligations, and liabilities of that Corporation to the Albury-Wodonga Development Corporation and for other purposes.
Confiscation (Amendment) Act 2003 (repealed)	No. 63 of 2003	
(Repealed by Statute Law (Further Revision) Act 2006 (No. 29 of 2006))
Commonwealth Games Arrangements (Governance) Act 2003	No. 64 of 2003	
National Environment Protection Council (Victoria) (Amendment) Act 2003 (repealed)	No. 65 of 2003	
(Repealed by Statute Law (Further Revision) Act 2006 (No. 29 of 2006))
Constitution (Supreme Court) Act 2003 (repealed)	No. 66 of 2003	
(Repealed by Statute Law (Further Revision) Act 2006 (No. 29 of 2006))
Health Legislation (Amendment) Act 2003 (repealed)	No. 67 of 2003	
(Repealed by Statute Law (Further Revision) Act 2006 (No. 29 of 2006))
Human Services (Complex Needs) Act 2003	No. 68 of 2003	
Non-Emergency Patient Transport Act 2003 or the Non-Emergency Patient Transport and First Aid Services Act 2003	No. 69 of 2003	14 October 2003
An Act to regulate the operation of the non-emergency transport of persons to or from medical services and the operation of particular stand-by services at public events, to amend the Ambulance Services Act 1986 (Note: Ambulance Services Act 1986 (No. 114 of 1986)) and for other purposes.
Superannuation Acts (Family Law) Act 2003 (repealed)	No. 70 of 2003	14 October 2003
(Repealed by Statute Law (Further Revision) Act 2006 (No. 29 of 2006))
Supreme Court (Vexatious Litigants) Act 2003 (repealed)	No. 71 of 2003	14 October 2003
An Act to amend section 21 of the Supreme Court Act 1986 (Note: Supreme Court Act 1986 (No. 110 of 1986)) to clarify the power of the Supreme Court to declare a person to be a vexatious litigant. (Repealed by Statute Law (Further Revision) Act 2006 (No. 29 of 2006))
Victorian Industry Participation Policy Act 2003 or the Local Jobs First Act 2003 (repealed)	No. 72 of 2003	14 October 2003
An Act to provide for the development and implementation of a Victorian Industry Participation Policy and require reports to Parliament on the policy's implementation and government agencies' compliance with it and for other purposes.
Grain Handling and Storage (Amendment) Act 2003 (repealed)	No. 73 of 2003	
(Repealed by Statute Law (Further Revision) Act 2006 (No. 29 of 2006))
Heritage (Amendment) Act 2003 (repealed)	No. 74 of 2003	
(Repealed by Statute Law (Further Revision) Act 2006 (No. 29 of 2006))
Instruments (Enduring Powers of Attorney) Act 2003 (repealed)	No. 75 of 2003	
(Repealed by Statute Law (Further Revision) Act 2006 (No. 29 of 2006))
Mental Health (Amendment) Act 2003 (repealed)	No. 76 of 2003	
(Repealed by Statute Law (Further Revision) Act 2006 (No. 29 of 2006))
Planning and Environment (Port of Melbourne) Act 2003 (repealed)	No. 77 of 2003	
(Repealed by Statute Law (Further Revision) Act 2006 (No. 29 of 2006))
Travel Agents (Amendment) Act 2003 (repealed)	No. 78 of 2003	
(Repealed by Statute Law (Further Revision) Act 2006 (No. 29 of 2006))
Aerodrome Landing Fees Act 2003	No. 79 of 2003	
Cemeteries and Crematoria Act 2003	No. 80 of 2003	11 November 2003
An Act to provide for the management and operation of cemeteries and crematoria, to repeal the Cemeteries Act 1958, (Note: Cemeteries Act 1958 (No. 6217)) to amend the Crimes Act 1958 (Note: Crimes Act 1958 (No. 6231)) and to consequentially amend other Acts and for other purposes.
Child Employment Act 2003	No. 81 of 2003	
Education (Workplace Learning) Act 2003 (repealed)	No. 82 of 2003	
(Repealed by Statute Law (Further Revision) Act 2006 (No. 29 of 2006))
Education Legislation (Miscellaneous Amendments) Act 2003 (repealed)	No. 83 of 2003	
(Repealed by Statute Law (Further Revision) Act 2006 (No. 29 of 2006))
Extractive Industries Development (Amendment) Act 2003	No. 84 of 2003	
Port Services (Port Management Reform) Act 2003 (repealed)	No. 85 of 2003	
(Repealed by Statute Law (Further Revision) Act 2006 (No. 29 of 2006))
Royal Botanic Gardens (Amendment) Act 2003 (repealed)	No. 86 of 2003	
(Repealed by Statute Law (Further Revision) Act 2006 (No. 29 of 2006))
Scots' Church Properties (Amendment) Act 2003 (repealed)	No. 87 of 2003	
(Repealed by Legislation Reform (Repeals No. 3) Act 2008 (No. 53 of 2008))
Victorian Curriculum and Assessment Authority (Amendment) Act 2003 (repealed)	No. 88 of 2003	
(Repealed by Statute Law (Further Revision) Act 2006 (No. 29 of 2006))
Victorian Qualifications Authority (Amendment) Act 2003 (repealed)	No. 89 of 2003	
(Repealed by Statute Law (Further Revision) Act 2006 (No. 29 of 2006))
Water Legislation (Amendment) Act 2003 (repealed)	No. 90 of 2003	
(Repealed by Statute Law (Further Revision) Act 2006 (No. 29 of 2006))
Electoral (Amendment) Act 2003 (repealed)	No. 91 of 2003	
(Repealed by Statute Law (Further Revision) Act 2006 (No. 29 of 2006))
Emerald Tourist Railway (Amendment) Act 2003 (repealed)	No. 92 of 2003	
(Repealed by Statute Law (Further Revision) Act 2006 (No. 29 of 2006))
Residential Tenancies (Amendment) Act 2003 (repealed)	No. 93 of 2003	
(Repealed by Statute Law (Further Revision) Act 2006 (No. 29 of 2006))
Road Safety (Amendment) Act 2003 (repealed)	No. 94 of 2003	
(Repealed by Statute Law (Further Revision) Act 2006 (No. 29 of 2006))
Accident Compensation and Transport Accident Acts (Amendment) 2003	No. 95 of 2003	
ANZAC Day (Amendment) Act 2003 (repealed)	No. 96 of 2003	
(Repealed by Statute Law (Further Revision) Act 2006 (No. 29 of 2006))
Forests and National Parks Acts (Amendment) Act 2003 (repealed)	No. 97 of 2003	
(Repealed by Statute Law (Further Revision) Act 2006 (No. 29 of 2006))
Health Legislation (Further Amendment) 2003	No. 98 of 2003	
Partnership (Venture Capital Funds) 2003 (repealed)	No. 99 of 2003	
(Repealed by Statute Law (Further Revision) Act 2006 (No. 29 of 2006))
Professional Standards Act 2003	No. 100 of 2003	2 December 2003
An Act to provide for the limitation of liability of members of occupational associations in certain circumstances and to facilitate improvement in the standards of services provided by those members and for other purposes.
Transport (Rights and Responsibilities) Act 2003 (repealed)	No. 101 of 2003	
(Repealed by Statute Law (Further Revision) Act 2006 (No. 29 of 2006))
Wrongs and Other Acts (Law of Negligence) Act 2003 (repealed)	No. 102 of 2003	
(Repealed by Statute Law (Further Revision) Act 2006 (No. 29 of 2006))
Animals Legislation (Animals Welfare) Act 2003	No. 103 of 2003	
Crimes (Money Laundering) Act 2003 (repealed)	No. 104 of 2003	
(Repealed by Statute Law (Further Revision) Act 2006 (No. 29 of 2006))
Crimes (Stalking) Act 2003 (repealed)	No. 105 of 2003	
(Repealed by Statute Law (Further Revision) Act 2006 (No. 29 of 2006))
Fair Trading (Further Amendment) Act 2003 (repealed)	No. 106 of 2003	
(Repealed by Statute Law (Further Revision) Act 2006 (No. 29 of 2006))
Firearms (Amendment) Act 2003 (repealed)	No. 107 of 2003	
(Repealed by Statute Law (Further Revision) Act 2006 (No. 29 of 2006))
Fisheries (Further Amendment) 2003 (repealed)	No. 108 of 2003	
(Repealed by Statute Law (Further Revision) Act 2006 (No. 29 of 2006))
Local Government (Democratic Reform) 2003 (repealed)	No. 109 of 2003	
(Repealed by Statute Law (Further Revision) Act 2006 (No. 29 of 2006))
Parliamentary Committees Act 2003	No. 110 of 2003	9 December 2003
An Act to establish certain parliamentary committees, to set out the functions, powers and procedures of certain parliamentary committees and to repeal the Parliamentary Committees Act 1968 (Note: Parliamentary Committees Act 1968 (No. 7727)) and for other purposes.
Road Safety (Drug Driving) 2003	No. 111 of 2003	
Shop Trading Reform (Simplification) 2003 (repealed)	No. 112 of 2003	
(Repealed by Statute Law (Further Revision) Act 2006 (No. 29 of 2006))
State Taxation Acts (Further Miscellaneous Amendments) Act 2003 (repealed)	No. 113 of 2003	
(Repealed by Statute Law (Further Revision) Act 2006 (No. 29 of 2006))
Gambling Regulation Act 2003	No. 114 of 2003	16 December 2003
An Act to re-enact and consolidate the law relating to various forms of gambling, to establish a Victorian Commission for Gambling Regulation, to amend the Casino Control Act 1991 (Note: Casino Control Act 1991 (No. 47 of 1991)) and other Acts, to repeal 8 Acts relating to gambling and for other purposes.

== Sources ==
- "Acts as made: 2003". Victoria Legislation.
