= List of acts of the Parliament of Victoria from 1991 =

This is a list of acts of the Parliament of Victoria, Australia for the year 1991.

== 1991 ==
Short title, or popular name	Citation	Royal assent
Long title
Interpretation of Legislation (Amendment) Act 1991	No. 6 of 1991	16 April 1991
An Act to amend the Interpretation of Legislation Act 1984 (Note: Interpretation of Legislation Act 1984 (No. 10096)) and the Subordinate Legislation Act 1962 (Note: Subordinate Legislation Act 1962 (No. 6886)) and certain other Acts and for other purposes.
Architects Act 1991	No. 13 of 1991	23 April 1991
An Act to provide for the registration of architects, to regulate the use of the title 'architect' and for other purposes.
Constitution Act Amendment (Electoral Procedures) Act 1991 (repealed)	No. 21 of 1991	21 May 1991
An Act to make miscellaneous amendments to The Constitution Act Amendment Act 1958. (Note: Constitution Act Amendment Act 1958 (No. 6224)) (Repealed by Statute Law Revision (Repeals) Act 1999 (No. 3 of 1999))
Docklands Authority Act 1991 or the Docklands Act 1991	No. 22 of 1991	21 May 1991
An Act to establish the Docklands Authority and to make other provision to facilitate the development of the docklands area and for other purposes.
Australian Catholic University (Victoria) Act 1991	No. 24 of 1991	4 June 1991
An Act relating to the Australian Catholic University and for other purposes.
Water (Waivers) Act 1991 (repealed)	No. 25 of 1991	12 June 1991
An Act to amend the Water Act 1989 (Note: Water Act 1989 (No. 80 of 1989)) and the Water (Consequential Amendments) Act 1989 (Note: Water (Consequential Amendments) Act 1989 (No. 81 of 1989)) and for other purposes. (Repealed by Statute Law Revision (Repeals) Act 1999 (No. 3 of 1999))
Bayside Project (Further Amendment) Act 1991 (repealed)	No. 28 of 1991	12 June 1991
An Act to further amend the Bayside Project Act 1988 (Note: Bayside Project Act 1988 (No. 67 of 1988)) and for other purposes. (Repealed by Statute Law Revision (Repeals) Act 1999 (No. 3 of 1999))
Victorian College of the Arts (Amendment) Act 1991	No. 33 of 1991	18 June 1991
An Act to amend the Victorian College of the Arts Act 1981 (Note: Victorian College of the Arts Act 1981 (No. 9566)) and for other purposes.
Constitution (Jurisdiction of Supreme Court) Act 1991	No. 35 of 1991	18 June 1991
An Act to amend the Constitution Act 1975 (Note: Constitution Act 1975 (No. 8750)) and the Constitution (Supreme Court) Act 1989 (Note: Constitution (Supreme Court) Act 1989 (No. 22 of 1989)) and for other purposes.
Aboriginal Lands Act 1991	No. 38 of 1991	18 June 1991
An Act to revoke the reservations and Crown Grants of certain lands and to authorise the grant of those lands to particular Aboriginal Organisations and for other purposes.
Supply (1991-92, No. 1) Act 1991 (repealed)	No. 39 of 1991	18 June 1991
An Act to make interim provision for the appropriation of moneys out of the Consolidated Fund for recurrent services and for certain works and purposes for the financial year 1991-92. (Repealed by Statute Law Revision (Repeals) Act 1999 (No. 3 of 1999))
Deakin University (Victoria College) Act 1991	No. 41 of 1991	18 June 1991
An Act to provide for the merger of Victoria College with Deakin University, to amend the Deakin University Act 1974 (Note: Deakin University Act 1974 (No. 8610)) and the Monash University Act 1958 (Note: Monash University Act 1958 (No. 6184)) and for other purposes.
Casino Control Act 1991	No. 47 of 1991	25 June 1991
An Act to provide for the establishment of a system for the licensing, supervision and control of casinos and for other purposes.
Sentencing Act 1991	No. 49 of 1991	25 June 1991
An Act to revise and restate the sentencing powers of courts, to provide sentencing principles to be applied by courts in sentencing offenders, to repeal the Penalties and Sentences Act 1985, (Note: Penalties and Sentences Act 1985 (No. 10260)) to vary the penalties that may be imposed in respect of offences under the Crimes Act 1958, (Note: Crimes Act 1958 (No. 6231)) to make consequential amendments to various Acts and for other purposes.
Gaming Machine Control Act 1991 or the Gaming Control Act 1991	No. 53 of 1991	15 October 1991
An Act to provide for the establishment of a system for the regulation, supervision and control of gaming machines and for other purposes.
Cattle Compensation (Amendment) Act 1991 (repealed)	No. 54 of 1991	15 October 1991
An Act to amend the Cattle Compensation Act 1967 (Note: Cattle Compensation Act 1967 (No. 7615)) and for other purposes. (Repealed by Statute Law Revision (Repeals) Act 1999 (No. 3 of 1999))
Australia and New Zealand Banking Group Limited (NMRB) Act 1991	No. 55 of 1991	29 October 1991
An Act to provide for the transfer to Australia and New Zealand Banking Group Limited of the undertaking of National Mutual Royal Bank Limited and for the transfer to Australia and New Zealand Savings Bank Limited of one part of the undertaking of National Mutual Royal Savings Bank Limited and for the transfer to Australia and New Zealand Banking Group Limited of the other part of the undertaking of National Mutual Royal Savings Bank Limited and for other purposes incidental thereto and consequential thereon.
Appropriation (1991-92, No. 1) Act 1991 (repealed)	No. 57 of 1991	31 October 1991
(Repealed by Statute Law Revision (Repeals) Act 1999 (No. 3 of 1999))
Gaming Machine Control (Cross-reference) Act 1991 or the Gaming Machine (Cross-reference) Act 1991 (repealed)	No. 60 of 1991	6 November 1991
An Act to correct a cross-reference in section 2 of the Gaming Machine Control Act 1991. (Note: Gaming Machine Control Act 1991 (No. 53 of 1991)) (Repealed by Statute Law Revision (Repeals) Act 1999 (No. 3 of 1999))
Emergency Services Superannuation (MFBSF Transfer) Act 1991 (Note: MFBSF is the Metropolitan Fire Brigades Superannuation Fund.) (repealed)	No. 64 of 1991	19 November 1991
An Act to amend the Emergency Services Superannuation Act 1986, (Note: Emergency Services Superannuation Act 1986 (No. 94 of 1986)) to repeal the Metropolitan Fire Brigades Superannuation Act 1976 (Note: Metropolitan Fire Brigades Superannuation Act 1976 (No. 8952)) and for other purposes. (Repealed by Statute Law Revision (Repeals) Act 1999 (No. 3 of 1999))
Crimes (Year and a Day Rule) Act 1991 (repealed)	No. 65 of 1991	19 November 1991
An Act to amend the Crimes Act 1958 and for other purposes. (Repealed by Statute Law Revision (Repeals) Act 1999 (No. 3 of 1999))
State Insurance Office (Sale) Act 1991 (repealed)	No. 68 of 1991	19 November 1991
An Act to amend the State Insurance Office Act 1984 (Note: State Insurance Office Act 1984 (No. 10089)) and for other purposes. (Repealed by Treasury Legislation (Repeal) Act 2005 (No. 73 of 2005))
Melbourne University (Hawthorn) Act 1991	No. 69 of 1991	19 November 1991
An Act to provide for the merger of the Hawthorn Institute of Education with Hawthorn Institute of Education Limited and for the affiliation of the Institute with the University of Melbourne and for other purposes.
Victoria University of Technology (Amendment) Act 1991 (repealed)	No. 70 of 1991	26 November 1991
An Act to amend the Victoria University of Technology Act 1990 (Note: Victoria University of Technology Act 1990 (No. 21 of 1990)) and for other purposes. (Repealed by Statute Law Revision (Repeals) Act 1999 (No. 3 of 1999))
Land Tax (Revision) Act 1991	No. 74 of 1991	26 November 1991
An Act to amend the Land Tax Act 1958 (Note: Land Tax Act 1958 (No. 6289)) and for other purposes.
National Rail Corporation (Victoria) Act 1991	No. 76 of 1991	3 December 1991
An Act to approve and give effect to an agreement between the Commonwealth, New South Wales, Victoria, Queensland and Western Australia relating to the National Rail Corporation Limited, to amend the Transport Act 1983 (Note: Transport Act 1983 (No. 9921)) and for other purposes.
Transport (Car Pooling) Act 1991 (repealed)	No. 79 of 1991	3 December 1991
An Act to amend the Transport Act 1983 to facilitate car pooling and for other purposes. (Repealed by Statute Law Revision (Repeals) Act 1999 (No. 3 of 1999))
Disability Services Act 1991 (repealed)	No. 80 of 1991	3 December 1991
An Act about the provision of services for persons with disabilities and other matters related to persons with disabilities. (Repealed by Disability Act 2006 (No. 23 of 2006))
Royal Botanic Gardens Act 1991	No. 87 of 1991	10 December 1991
An Act to establish the Royal Botanic Gardens Board and define its functions, to provide for the management of the Royal Botanic Gardens, Melbourne, and the National Herbarium of Victoria, to make consequential amendments to the Drugs, Poisons and Controlled Substances Act 1981 (Note: Drugs, Poisons and Controlled Substances Act 1981 (No. 9719)) and for other purposes.
Albury-Wodonga Agreement (Amendment) Act 1991	No. 88 of 1991	10 December 1991
An Act to amend the Albury-Wodonga Agreement Act 1973 (Note: Albury-Wodonga Agreement Act 1973 (No. 8520)) and for other purposes.
Adult, Community and Further Education Act 1991	No. 91 of 1991	10 December 1991
An Act to make provision with respect to Adult, Community and Further Education, to establish an Adult, Community and Further Education Board, to amend the Council of Adult Education Act 1981, (Note: Council of Adult Education Act 1981 (No. 9595)) the Post-Secondary Education Act 1978, (Note: Post-Secondary Education Act 1978 (No. 9145)) and the Vocational Education and Training Act 1990 (Note: Vocational Education and Training Act 1990 (No. 45 of 1990)) and for other purposes.
Abattoir and Meat Inspection (Amendment) Act 1991	No. X of 1991	
Accident Compensation (Amendment) Act 1991 (repealed)	No. 18 of 1991	
(Repealed by Statute Law Revision (Repeals) Act 1999 (No. 3 of 1999))
Administrative Appeals Tribunal (Planning) Act 1991	No. X of 1991	
Adoption (Amendment) Act 1991	No. X of 1991	
Borrowing and Investment Powers (Further Amendment) Act 1991 (repealed)	No. 31 of 1991	
(Repealed by Statute Law Revision (Repeals) Act 1999 (No. 3 of 1999))
Broiler Chicken Industry (Amendment) Act 1991	No. X of 1991	
Burrumbeet Land Act 1991	No. X of 1991	
Cemeteries (Amendment) Act 1991 (repealed)	No. 7 of 1991	
(Repealed by Statute Law Revision (Repeals) Act 1999 (No. 3 of 1999))
Co-operation (Credit Co-operatives) Act 1991	No. X of 1991	
Community Protection (Amendment) Act 1991 (repealed)	No. 4 of 1991	
(Repealed by Statute Law Revision (Repeals) Act 1999 (No. 3 of 1999))
Corporations (Victoria) (Amendment) Act 1991	No. X of 1991	
Corrections (Prison Management and Prisoners) Act 1991 (repealed)	No. 16 of 1991	
(Repealed by Statute Law Revision (Repeals) Act 1999 (No. 3 of 1999))
Corrections (Remissions) Act 1991	No. X of 1991	
Courts (Case Transfer) Act 1991	No. X of 1991	
Credit (Further Amendment) Act 1991 (repealed)	No. 34 of 1991	
(Repealed by Statute Law (Further Revision) Act 2006 (No. 29 of 2006))
Crimes (Confiscation of Profits) (Amendment) Act 1991	No. X of 1991	
Crimes (Rape) Act 1991	No. X of 1991	
Crimes (Sexual Offences) Act 1991	No. X of 1991	
Crimes Legislation (Miscellaneous Amendments) Act 1991	No. X of 1991	
Extractive Industries (Further Amendment) Act 1991 (repealed)	No. 27 of 1991	
(Repealed by Statute Law Revision (Repeals) Act 1999 (No. 3 of 1999))
Fire Authorities (Amendment) Act 1991 (repealed)	No. 5 of 1991	
(Repealed by Legislation Reform (Repeals No. 2) Act 2008 (No. 16 of 2008))
Food (Amendment) Act 1991 (repealed)	No. 13 of 1991	
(Repealed by Legislation Reform (Repeals No. 1) Act 2008 (No. 10 of 2008))
Friendly Societies (Reserve Board) Act 1991	No. X of 1991	
Health (Infectious Diseases) Act 1991 (repealed)	No. 59 of 1991	
(Repealed by Statute Law Revision (Repeals) Act 1999 (No. 3 of 1999))
Health Registration Acts (Amendment) Act 1991 (repealed)	No. 10 of 1991	
(Repealed by Statute Law Revision (Repeals) Act 1999 (No. 3 of 1999))
Health Services (Conciliation and Review) (Further Amendment) Act 1991 (repealed)	No. 42 of 1991	
(Repealed by Statute Law Revision (Repeals) Act 1999 (No. 3 of 1999))
Historic Buildings (Further Amendment) Act 1991	No. X of 1991	
Land (Miscellaneous) Act 1991	No. X of 1991	
Land (Reservations Removal) Act 1991	No. X of 1991	
Land (Revocation and Other Matters) Act 1991	No. X of 1991	
Litter (Amendment) Act 1991 (repealed)	No. 82 of 1991	
(Repealed by Statute Law Revision (Repeals) Act 1999 (No. 3 of 1999))
Local Government (Rating) Act 1991	No. X of 1991	
Lotteries Gaming and Betting (Amendment) Act 1991 (repealed)	No. 3 of 1991	
(Repealed by Statute Law Revision (Repeals) Act 1999 (No. 3 of 1999))
Martial Arts Control (Further Amendment) Act 1991 (repealed)	No. 30 of 1991	
(Repealed by Statute Law Revision (Repeals) Act 1999 (No. 3 of 1999))
Medical Practitioners (Amendment) Act 1991 (repealed)	No. 52 of 1991	
(Repealed by Statute Law Revision (Repeals) Act 1999 (No. 3 of 1999))
Melbourne Lands and Market Sites Act 1991	No. X of 1991	
Metung Land Act 1991	No. X of 1991	
National Parks (Miscellaneous Amendments) Act 1991	No. X of 1991	
Pathology Services Accreditation (Further Amendment) Act 1991 (repealed)	No. 9 of 1991	
(Repealed by Statute Law Revision (Repeals) Act 1999 (No. 3 of 1999))
Pay-roll Tax (Superannuation) Act 1991 (repealed)	No. 14 of 1991	
(Repealed by Statute Law Revision (Repeals) Act 1999 (No. 3 of 1999))
Pollution of Waters by Oil and Noxious Substances (Amendment) Act 1991 (repealed)	No. 46 of 1991	
(Repealed by Statute Law Revision (Repeals) Act 1999 (No. 3 of 1999))
Portarlington Land Act 1991	No. X of 1991	
Racing (Betting Competitions and Mixed Sports) Act 1991 (repealed)	No. 66 of 1991	
(Repealed by Statute Law Revision (Repeals) Act 1999 (No. 3 of 1999))
Racing (Miscellaneous Amendments) Act 1991	No. X of 1991	
Racing (Sunday Mixed Sports Gatherings) Act 1991 (repealed)	No. 12 of 1991	
(Repealed by Statute Law Revision (Repeals) Act 1999 (No. 3 of 1999))
Retail Tenancies (Rent Review) Act 1991	No. X of 1991	
Road Safety (Drivers) Act 1991 (repealed)	No. X of 1991	
Road Safety (Further Amendment) Act 1991	No. 89 of 1991	
(Repealed by Legislation Reform (Repeals No. 3) Act 2008 (No. 53 of 2008))
Shop Trading (Further Amendment) Act 1991	No. X of 1991	
State Trust Corporation of Victoria (Amendment) Act 1991 (repealed)	No. 84 of 1991	
(Repealed by Statute Law Revision (Repeals) Act 1999 (No. 3 of 1999))
Subdivision (Miscellaneous Amendments) Act 1991 (repealed)	No. 48 of 1991	
(Repealed by Legislation Reform (Repeals No. 3) Act 2008 (No. 53 of 2008))
Teaching Service (Further Amendment) Act 1991	No. X of 1991	
Victorian Curriculum and Assessment Board (Amendment) Act 1991 (repealed)	No. 67 of 1991	
(Repealed by Statute Law Revision (Repeals) Act 1999 (No. 3 of 1999))
Victorian Debt Retirement Fund (Amendment) Act 1991 (repealed)	No. 63 of 1991	
(Repealed by Statute Law Revision (Repeals) Act 1999 (No. 3 of 1999))
Victorian Relief Committee (Amendment) Act 1991 (repealed)	No. 17 of 1991	
(Repealed by Statute Law Revision (Repeals) Act 1999 (No. 3 of 1999))
Wattle Park Land Act 1991	No. X of 1991	
Werribee South Land Act 1991	No. X of 1991	
Witness Protection Act 1991	No. X of 1991	
Works and Services (Ancillary Provisions, 1991-92, No. 1) Act 1991 (repealed)	No. 40 of 1991	
(Repealed by Statute Law Revision (Repeals) Act 1999 (No. 3 of 1999))
Works and Services (Ancillary Provisions, 1991-92, No. 2) Act 1991 (repealed)	No. 58 of 1991	
(Repealed by Statute Law Revision (Repeals) Act 1999 (No. 3 of 1999))

== Sources ==
- "1991 Victorian Historical Acts". AustLII.
