= Opas =

Opas is a surname. Notable people with the surname include:

- David Opas (1936–1980), Australian judge
- Pauli Opas (1929–2011), Finnish diplomat
- Philip Opas (1917–2008), Australian barrister

== See also ==
- Opas Ruengpanyawut (1955–2020), Thai sport shooter
