= Ronald Ryan =

Australian murderer (1925–1967)

- Born: Ronald Edmond Thompson; 21 February 1925; Carlton, Victoria, Australia
- Died: 3 February 1967 (aged 41); HM Prison Pentridge, Victoria, Australia
- Height: 5 ft 8 in (1.73 m)
- Spouse: Dorothy Janet (née George)
- Status: Executed by hanging
- Conviction: Murder
- Penalty: Death

Ronald Joseph Ryan (21 February 1925 – 3 February 1967) was the last person to be legally executed in Australia. Ryan was found guilty of shooting and killing warder George Hodson during an escape from Pentridge Prison, Victoria, in 1965. Ryan's hanging was met with public protests by those opposed to capital punishment. Capital punishment was abolished in all states by 1985.

== Early life ==
Ronald Edmond Thompson was born at the Royal Women's Hospital in Melbourne's inner suburb of Carlton to John Ronald Ryan and Cecilia Thompson (née Young). Cecilia had a son with her first husband, George Harry Thompson. George left Cecilia in 1915 to fight in the Great War and they never resumed their relationship. Cecilia met Ryan while working as a nurse in Woods Point where he was suffering from lung disease. They formed a relationship in 1924 and married in 1929, after Thompson's death in 1927 when he fell from a tram and was struck by a car. Ronald then adopted the name Ronald Edmond Ryan. In 1936, Ryan was confirmed in the Roman Catholic Church. He took as his confirmation name Joseph, becoming Ronald Edmond Joseph Ryan. He did not like Edmond and from then on used "Ronald Joseph Ryan".

His three sisters were made wards of the state a year later when authorities declared them to be neglected. His sisters were sent to the Good Shepherd Convent in Collingwood. Ryan absconded from Rupertswood in September 1939 and, with his half-brother George Thompson, worked in and around Balranald, New South Wales; spare money earned from sleeper cutting and kangaroo shooting was sent to his mother, who was looking after their sick, alcoholic father.

At the age of 20, Ryan had saved enough money to rent a house in Balranald. He collected his mother and sisters and they lived together in this house. Ryan's father stayed in Melbourne and died a year later, aged 62, after a long battle with miners' disease, phthisis tuberculosis.

== Move to Victoria, marriage and children ==
Aged about 22, Ryan decided to join his brother, who was tomato farming near Tatura, Victoria. He started visiting Melbourne on weekends and during one of these weekend trips he met Dorothy Janet George. On 4 February 1950, Ryan and Dorothy were married at St Stephen's Anglican Church in Richmond, Victoria. He converted from Roman Catholicism to the Church of England to marry her. He converted back to Catholicism shortly before his execution. Dorothy was the daughter of the mayor of the Melbourne suburb of Hawthorn. Ryan and Dorothy had three daughters, Janice, Wendy and Rhonda. A fourth baby was stillborn.

== Later life ==
After spending a few months working for his father-in-law as a trainee mechanic, Ryan decided that more money could be made cutting timber near Marysville and Licola. When it was too wet to cut timber, Ryan got a job painting for the State Electricity Commission. By 1952 the Ryan family was living in Noojee.

Trouble with the law started when his rented house burnt down. Ryan was away for the weekend in Melbourne when the arsonist struck. The arsonist was caught and claimed that Ryan had put him up to it in order to claim insurance money. His first appearance in court was in Warragul in 1953 when he was acquitted on a charge of arson.

In 1956 Ryan appeared in court for passing bad cheques in Dandenong. He was given a bond. His next appearance in court was after he issued a large number of forged cheques in Warrnambool. His partner was caught with the goods purchased with the bad cheques and handed Ryan over to the police. He received another good-behaviour bond after the arresting detective gave a favourable character reference on Ryan's behalf.

Ryan first served prison time at Bendigo Prison. Here, under Ian Grindlay (who would later become the Governor of Pentridge Prison), he appeared to want to better himself. He was studying for his Matriculation (the successful completion of 12 years of formal schooling) when he was released on parole in August 1963. He was regarded by the authorities as a model prisoner.

After working as a clerk for a couple of months, Ryan went to lunch and never returned to his workplace as he had started robbing butchers' shops and used explosives to blow their safes.

Ryan and two accomplices were caught after a shop robbery on 4 January 1964. On 6 January he was charged with breaking and entering and theft offences. Bailed on 3 February 1964, Ryan fled to New South Wales. He later admitted to nine robberies in New South Wales between 4 April and 11 July 1964. On a visit home on 14 July he was caught by Victoria Police in the early hours the next morning. On 13 November 1964 he received an eight-year prison sentence for breaking and entering. He was sent to Pentridge Prison.

== Escape ==
At Pentridge Prison, Ryan was placed in B Division where he met fellow prisoner Peter John Walker, who was serving a 12-year sentence for bank robbery. When Ryan was informed that his wife was seeking a divorce, he made a plan to escape from prison. Walker decided to go along with him. Ryan planned to take himself and his family and flee to Brazil, which did not have an extradition treaty with Australia.

On 19 December 1965, Ryan and Walker scaled the prison wall and ran along the top of the wall to a prison watchtower, where they disarmed prison officer Helmut Lange, took him hostage, threatened him with his own M1 rifle and ordered him to open the gate. Lange agreed, but deliberately pulled the wrong lever. Ryan and Walker proceeded downstairs with their hostage only to find that the gate would not open. When Ryan realised Lange had tricked him, he jabbed the rifle into Lange's back and marched him back up the stairs so Lange could pull the correct lever to open the tower gate. The two escapees then exited through the gate into the prison car park. To their dismay there were only six cars in the car park and five had flat tyres.

However, they did encounter the prison chaplain, Brigadier James Hewitt of the Salvation Army, in the car park. The escapees grabbed Hewitt and used him as a shield. Ryan, armed with the rifle, pointed it at Hewitt and demanded his car. Prison Officer Bennett in Tower 2 saw the prisoners. Ryan called to Bennett to throw down his rifle. Bennett ducked out of sight and then got his rifle.

When Hewitt told Ryan he did not have his car that day, Ryan rifle-butted him in the head causing serious injuries. Les Watt, a petrol attendant who watched the escape from a petrol station on Sydney Rd, witnessed Ryan hitting Hewitt with the rifle. The escapees then left the badly injured chaplain and Ryan ran out to Champ Street, directly in front of the south-west corner of the prison.

Walker went south across Church Street toward the adjacent Roman Catholic church in Sydney Road. Prison officer Bennett aimed his rifle at Walker and ordered him to halt or he would shoot. Walker took cover behind a small wall that bordered the church. The prison alarm was raised by Warder Lange, and it began to blow loudly, indicating a prison escape. Unarmed warders, Wallis, Mitchinson and Paterson, came running out of the prison's main gate and onto the street.

Prison officer George Hodson responded to the whistle and was told by Bennett that he had Walker pinned down. Hodson ran over to Walker and disarmed him, but Walker managed to get free and both men ran towards the armed Ryan.

Meanwhile, confusion and noise were increasing around the busy intersection of Sydney Road and O'Hea Street and across to the Champ Street intersection, with Ryan waving the rifle around trying to get cars to stop so he could commandeer them, and people ducking for cover between cars.

Frank and Pauline Jeziorski were travelling south on Champ Street and had slowed to give way to traffic on Sydney Road when Ryan armed with the rifle appeared in front of their car. Ryan threatened the driver and his passenger wife to get out of their car. The driver, Frank Jeziorski, turned his car off, put it in neutral then got out of his vehicle. Ryan got in via the driver's door. Surprisingly, Pauline Jeziorski refused to get out of the car. She was persuaded by Ryan to get out, only to go back in the car to get her handbag. Paterson, realising Ryan was armed, returned inside the prison to get a rifle.

Warder William Mitchinson was first to reach the car and grabbed Ryan through the driver's window, he told Ryan "the game's up". Warder Thomas Wallis who was following, ran to Pauline Jeziorski's side of the car. He grabbed her and pulled her away from the car.

In frustration, Ryan forced Mitchinson to back off, then got out of the passenger's side door and noticed Walker running towards him, being chased by Hodson who was holding the pipe in his hand. Walker was shouting frantically to Ryan that prison guard William Bennett, standing on the Number 2 prison tower, had his rifle aimed at them. At this time, Hodson was chasing Walker; Ryan took a couple of steps forward, raised his rifle, aimed at Hodson, and allegedly fired.

George Hodson fell to the ground. He had been struck by a single bullet that exited through Hodson's back, about an inch lower than the point of entry in his right chest. Hodson died in the middle of Sydney Road. Warder Robert Paterson, now with a rifle, ran back outside and onto Champ Street.

Ryan and Walker ran past the critically wounded Hodson and commandeered a blue Standard Vanguard sedan on Sydney Road from its driver, Brian Mullins. With Walker driving and Ryan a passenger, the car travelled through an adjacent service station and then west along O'Hea Street.

== On the run ==
Ryan and Walker successfully eluded their pursuers outside Pentridge Prison and drove away before changing cars. They then made their way south following the Moonee Ponds Creek to change cars again before hiding in a safe house in Kensington provided by Norman Harold Murray. The following day the men moved into Christine Aitken's flat in Ormond Road, Elwood.

The prison escape dominated newspapers and other media. One newspaper reported that, "Ronald Ryan, serving time for burglary, seized a prison officer and shot him three times, twice in the chest and once in the back." Reports of their activities caused widespread anxiety.

On 24 December, Ryan (armed with the warder's rifle) and Walker robbed an ANZ bank in North Road, Ormond. The bank manager and a customer were ordered out of his office with a revolver (different to the warder's rifle). Ryan herded 13 people into the bank's strongroom and stole A£4500. A witness, June Crawford, told reporters, "a bandit told me 'This gun shot a man a few days ago.'" Ryan and Walker escaped in a 1952 Holden sedan.

On the same day, the Victorian Government announced a £6,000 reward for information leading to the capture of Ryan and Walker. It was reported in The Age that the Chief Secretary and Attorney General, Arthur Rylah, had issued a warning to the escapees that the killing of Hodson during the prison escape was the worst Victoria had known and that the "Hanging Act was still in force."

On 24 December there was a party at the flat. A petty criminal, John Fisher, who knew Ryan, and Arthur Henderson (Aitken's boyfriend) were there. After all their beer had been consumed, Walker and Henderson left to find sly-grog in Albert Park for more drinks. An hour later Walker returned alone to the flat. He had killed Henderson in a Middle Park toilet block, having shot him in the back of the head. The escapees left the flat and returned to Kensington. On 26 December, Aitken and another woman were charged with harbouring the criminals. They came forward after Henderson was killed and the escapees had left. The charges were later dropped. The pair returned to hiding in the basement of the house in Kensington. Murray was given money to buy a car in Sydney and return with it. Murray returned with the car with Queensland plates on 31 December. Ryan and Walker left for Sydney on 1 January 1966 and arrived on 2 January.

== Recapture ==
After arriving in Sydney, Ryan and Walker endeavoured to establish some safe houses; Ryan also wanted to make contact with a woman he knew when he was in Sydney years ago; she was not home but her daughter was. Ryan arranged to meet the woman and daughter at Concord Repatriation Hospital on the evening of 6 January. However, the daughter recognised Ryan and tipped off the police. Detective Inspector (DI) Ray "Gunner" Kelly was informed about the planned meeting and set a trap with a heavily armed contingent of 50 police officers and detectives.

When the escapees' car pulled up near the hospital, Ryan walked over to a nearby telephone box, but it had been deliberately put out of order, so he walked to a nearby shop and asked to use the phone. The owner had been instructed to tell Ryan that his phone was also out of order, and as Ryan walked out of the shop he was tackled by six detectives, dropping a loaded .32 revolver that he had been carrying. At the same moment Det. Sgt Fred Krahe thrust a shotgun through the car window and held it at Walker's head, and he was captured without a struggle. Ryan and Walker had been on the run for 19 days. In the boot of the car police found three pistols, a shotgun and two rifles, all fully loaded, an axe, jemmy, two coils of rope, a hacksaw and two boiler suits.

== Extradition ==
Ryan and Walker were extradited to Melbourne. They were jointly tried for the murder of George Hodson. The police alleged that Ryan made three verbal confessions whilst being extradited and admitted he had shot prison officer Hodson. However, Ryan denied making any verbal or written confessions. The only document signed by Ryan stated that he would give no verbal testimony. Walker was also tried for the murder of Arthur James Henderson during the period when he and Ryan were at large.

== Trial and sentencing ==
On 15 March 1966, the case of The Queen v. Ryan and Walker began in the Supreme Court of Victoria. The first day was spent choosing the jury. Ryan and Walker each exercised their legal right in objecting to twenty candidates.

=== Crown's case ===
The Crown's case presented no scientific evidence. Ryan's rifle was never scientifically tested by ballistics experts to prove that it had fired a shot. The fatal bullet and the spent cartridge casing were never recovered so no ballistic or forensic evidence was available to prove that Ryan had fired the fatal shot.

The Crown's case relied only on eyewitnesses who were near Pentridge Prison when Hodson was shot and killed, because there was no scientific forensic evidence to prove Ryan fired a shot. Each eyewitness testified to a different account of what they saw and where Ryan was standing. Eleven eyewitnesses swore that they saw Ryan waving and aiming his rifle. There were variations, whether Ryan was standing, walking or squatting at the time a single shot was heard and whether Ryan was to the left or right of Hodson. Only four eyewitnesses testified that they saw Ryan fire a shot. Two eyewitnesses testified that they saw smoke coming from Ryan's rifle. Two eyewitnesses testified that they saw Ryan's weapon recoil.

Some witnesses testified that they saw Ryan's rifle recoil when he fired and also saw smoke from Ryan's rifle. The owners of the car Ryan got into, Frank and Pauline Jeziorski, were two of the witnesses. A warder, Thomas Wallis, testified that he saw smoke come out of the rifle Ryan was holding. Pauline Jeziorski testified that she smelled gunpowder after Ryan had fired the shot.

All of the prison officers who testified stated that they did not see Hodson carrying anything and that they did not see Hodson hit Walker. However, two witnesses, Louis Bailey and Keith Dobson, testified that they saw Hodson carrying something like an iron-bar or baton as he was chasing after Walker. Governor Grindlay testified that he did not see a bar near Hodson's body but that he found one after Hodson's body was loaded into an ambulance.

==== Verbal confessions ====
The Crown also relied upon unrecorded unsigned testimony that Ryan had, allegedly, verbally confessed to shooting Hodson.

Detective Sergeant KP "Bill" Walters told the court that on 6 January 1966, the day after his capture in Sydney, Ryan said

In the heat of the moment you sometimes do an act without thinking. I think this is what happened with Hodson. He had no need to interfere. He was stupid. He was told to keep away. He grabbed Pete [Walker] and hit him with an iron bar. He caused his own death. I didn't want to shoot him. I could have shot a lot more.

Detective Senior Constable Harry Morrison told the court that on 7 January 1966 during the flight taking Ryan to Melbourne, Ryan said: "The warder spoilt the whole show. If he had not poked his great head into it he would not have got shot. It was either him or Pete."

The Crown also called the two bank officers from the bank that Ryan and Walker robbed. Robert Sipthorpe and George Robertson testified that Ryan said "This is the gun that shot a man the other day!" At trial, Ryan's defence lawyer Philip Opas cross-examined the two witnesses asking if instead they heard "This is the type of gun that shot a man the other day." Both witnesses stuck to their story.

John Fisher, who had a long criminal history and had not seen or heard from Ryan for more than two years, testified that he asked Ryan who had shot Hodson. Fisher said Ryan told him he had shot Hodson.

None of the confessions were signed by Ryan, who only signed documents saying that he would give no verbal testimony. Ryan testified he had been "verballed" and denied the allegations of verbal confessions said to have been made by him.

=== Defence's case ===
The main problem for the defence was that Victoria had the Gaols Act of 1958 in which it stated:

- Every male person lawfully imprisoned for any crime misdemeanour or offence by the sentence of any court of competent jurisdiction, or employed at labour as a criminal on the roads or other public works of Victoria who escapes or attempts to escape from any gaol or from the custody of any member of the police force gaoler or other officer in whose custody he may be, shall be guilty of felony:
- If a killing occurs by an act of violence in the course of a commission of a felony involving violence or in the furtherance of the purpose of such a felony the accused is guilty of murder even though, there is no actual intention of killing.

The defence spent a lot of time arguing about when the time of the felony ended. Did it end when the prisoners had cleared the prison walls or when the prisoners were caught and returned to custody?

The defence pointed to various substantial discrepancies in The Crown's case. While some eyewitnesses testified they saw Ryan to the east of Hodson when a single shot was heard, other eyewitnesses testified Ryan was to the west of Hodson. The discrepancies in evidence were substantial and wide-ranging. Opas contended that the fourteen eyewitnesses' evidence were so contradictory that little store could be placed on them.

Philip Opas produced a human skeleton as a visual aid to explain the trajectory of the fatal bullet, Opas argued that the ballistics evidence indicated that the fatal bullet entered Hodson's (chest) body in a downward trajectory. He also got a Monash University mathematics professor, Terry Speed, to explain that Ryan, 5 feet 8 inches (1.73 m) tall would have had to have been 8 feet 3 inches (2.51 m) tall to have fired the shot. These calculations were based on Ryan being twenty feet from Hodson and Hodson was standing perfectly upright. The bullet would enter Hodson's body 62 inches from the ground and exit 61 inches from the ground. If the shot was in a downward angle the bullet would have hit the road forty feet from where Hodson was hit, it also suggested that Hodson could have been shot from another elevated point and possibly by another prison officer. It would cast doubt that Ryan had fired the fatal shot. But the prosecution argued that Hodson, 6 feet 1 inch (1.85 m) tall could have been running in a stooped position, thus accounting for the bullet's fatal angle of entry. No witnesses saw or testified seeing Hodson running in a stooped position.

The trial judge dismissed the trajectory theory put forward by Opas, as did the judges at the Appeal two months later. They said there was enough evidence to say Hodson was not standing fully erect but was running in a leaning position when he was shot.

Opas in defending Ryan put a lot of pressure on a warder who made conflicting statements. Paterson had made several mutually contradictory statements to police about what he saw, heard and did on that day. In his first statement given to Detective Sergeant Carton on 19 December 1965 Paterson said; "I did not hear a shot fired other than the one I fired." In a second statement given to Senior Detective Morrison on 12 January 1966 Paterson said, "Just as I turned into the entrance to the garden I heard a shot." In a third statement on 3 February 1966 Paterson said, "I ran back inside and asked for a gun, I went to the main gate and I received a gun and ran back outside, as I was running on to the lawn I heard the crack of a shot." Paterson changed his story, too, about who was in the line of fire when he aimed his rifle. In his first statement Paterson said, "I sighted my rifle at Ryan and was about to fire when a woman walked into the line of fire and I lifted my rifle." In his second statement Paterson said, "I took aim at Ryan but two prison officers were in the line of fire so I dropped my rifle again." In his third statement Paterson said, "I took aim at Ryan and I found out I had to fire between two prison officers to get Ryan, so I lowered my gun again."

Ryan testified that he kept the rifle to prove his innocence in the event of capture, as he knew that microscopic markings on the bullet would prove that it was not fired from his rifle.

Despite extensive search by police, neither the fatal bullet nor the spent cartridge were ever found. Although all prison-authorised rifles were the same M1 carbine type, scientific testing would have proven which rifle fired the fatal shot as a microscopic "unique marker" is left on a bullet as it travels through the barrel.

All the bullets in Ryan's M1 carbine rifle would be accounted for if Ryan cocked the rifle with the safety-catch on; this faulty operation (conceded by prison officer Lange, assistant prison governor Robert Duffy, and confirmed by ballistic experts at trial) would have caused an undischarged bullet to be ejected, spilling onto the floor of the guard tower. Opas established that for a person who was inexperienced in handling that type of rifle and its cocking lever, it would be easy to jam the rifle and any attempt to clear the jam would result in a live round being ejected.

On the eighth day of the trial Ryan was sworn in and took the witness stand. Ryan denied firing a shot, denied making any verbal confessions, and denied ever saying to anyone that he had shot a man. According to Ryan, they were after the reward money by making false allegations. "At no time did I fire a shot. My freedom was the only objective. The rifle was taken in the first instance so that it could not be used against me."

After a trial in the Victorian Supreme Court lasting twelve sitting days Ryan was convicted of the murder of Hodson and sentenced to death by Justice John Starke, the mandatory sentence at that time. Asked if he had anything to say before sentencing Ryan stated "I still maintain my innocence. I will consult with my counsel with a view to appeal. That is all I have to say!" Walker was found not guilty of murder, but guilty of manslaughter and sentenced to 12 years imprisonment. He was also found guilty of manslaughter for the death of Arthur Henderson and received an 12-year sentence. Walker was paroled in 1984. He died on 5 March 2022, at the age of 80.

== After the trial ==
According to juryman Tom Gildea's account of discussions in the jury room, the jury thought that the death sentence would be commuted, as had happened in the previous 35 death penalties cases since 1951. Gildea said,

Of the jury, two members held out the first vote we took, but 10 of us were sure Ryan was guilty. He was a bit too sure of himself in the witness box but the thing that decided us was handling the rifle which had killed Hodson. We had been told the rifle had a hair trigger, but when we examined it we found we had to pull it at least half an inch and use quite a bit of force." Eight members of the jury were experienced with rifles either in the country or overseas with war service.

Gildea also said, "I don't know how much experience the judge and the lawyers had but we had had our share in the jury box I can tell you."

When it was apparent that the Victorian Government was intent on hanging Ryan, Gildea contacted nine jury members. Gildea said that of the twelve jurors, three refused to sign petitions, one was convinced of Ryan's guilt and two believed Ryan was not guilty. Two other jurors could not be contacted.

Seven jury members, including Gildea, signed petitions requesting Ryan's death sentence be commuted to life in prison. Later, some of the jurors came forth and stated they would never have convicted Ryan of murder had they known that he would in fact be executed. Gildea said "We didn't want the rope. If we had known Ryan would hang, I think we would have gone for manslaughter."

== Appeal ==
Opas decided to appeal against the murder verdict. The appeal was to the Victorian Court of Criminal Appeal, a bench consisting of three judges of the Supreme Court. The basis of the appeal was that the verdict was against the weight of the evidence. He argued that there were inherent inconsistencies and improbabilities and even impossibilities in the evidence.

At the trial there had been a legal argument on when the crime of escaping from jail had been completed. In the Crimes Act, a relevant section provides that "every male person lawfully imprisoned for any crime who escapes shall be guilty of a felony".

At the trial, Mr Justice Starke had directed the jury: "In certain circumstances, the crime of murder may be established even though the accused had no intention of killing. And that is so in these circumstances. If a killing occurs by an act of violence in the course of a commission of a felony involving violence, or in the furtherance of the purpose of such felony, the accused is guilty of murder, even though there is no actual intention of killing." There was long legal argument on when the escape felony finished, did it stop once Ryan and Walker left the prison property or did it continue until they were caught in Sydney nineteen days later?

The appeal was dismissed on 8 June 1966.

On 14 October 1966, the Full Bench of the High Court of Australia rejected appeals by Ryan and Walker. With all legal avenues yet to be exhausted, legal aid to Ryan was cut by the Bolte Government. Premier Bolte then directed the Public Solicitor to withdraw Opas' brief as the government was not going to fund the petition to the Judicial Committee of the Privy Council.

Ryan had a right to increased free legal assistance for expert forensics analysis, to hire expert witnesses, and to present a series of appeals and recourses that were available to those facing execution by the government. The Full Court agreed that it was unthinkable that a man should be executed before he had exhausted his ultimate right of appeals. Opas decided to apply to the Privy Council in London. The appeal is a vestigial remnant of an appeal to the sovereign in person.

On 12 December 1966, the State Executive Council (Premier Bolte's cabinet) announced that Ryan would hang on 9 January 1967.

Opas, convinced of Ryan's innocence, agreed to work without pay. Opas consulted the Ethics Committee of the Bar Council to seek approval to make a public appeal for a solicitor prepared to brief him, as Opas was prepared to pay his travel, other expenses and appear without fee. The Committee said that this would be touting for business and was unethical. Opas argued that a man's life was at stake and he could not see how he would be touting when no payment was involved. Opas defied the ruling and on national radio sought an instructor. Opas was inundated with offers and accepted the first application, being from Ralph Freadman. Alleyne Kiddle was in London completing a master's degree and she agreed to take a junior brief without a fee.

On 4 January 1967, the State Executive Council stayed Ryan's execution pending an approach to the Judicial Committee of the Privy Council.

Opas then flew to London to present Ryan's case to the highest judges in the Commonwealth. Ryan's execution was delayed by Premier Bolte awaiting the Privy Council's decision.

On 23 January 1967, the Judicial Committee of the Privy Council refused Ryan leave for appeal.

On 25 January 1967, the State Executive Council set Ryan's execution date as 31 January.

On 30 January 1967, Justice Starke ordered a stay of execution following an affidavit from former prisoner John Tolmie who said he saw a warder fire a shot from Number 1 tower at the time of the murder. The following day Tolmie was charged with perjury for making a false affidavit; he was not in gaol at the time of the escape.

Bolte scheduled Ryan's execution for the morning of Friday 3 February 1967, a week before the dismissal of the appeal to the Privy Council was published in the Government Gazette.

== Final appeals ==
The State Government of Victoria had commuted every death sentence passed since 1951, after Robert Clayton, Norman Andrews and Jean Lee were executed for the torture and murder of an old man.

Starke reported that the Premier of Victoria, Sir Henry Bolte, insisted that the death sentence be carried out. Bolte's cabinet was unanimous although there were at least four State cabinet members who opposed capital punishment.

When it became apparent that Bolte intended to proceed with the execution, a secret eleventh-hour plea for mercy was made by four of the jury members. They sent petitioning letters to the Governor of Victoria, Sir Rohan Delacombe, stating that in reaching their verdict they believed that capital punishment had been abolished in Victoria and requested that the governor exercise the Royal Prerogative of Mercy and commute Ryan's sentence of death.

The Age, The Herald and The Sun newspapers all ran campaigns opposing the hanging of Ryan. The papers ran a campaign of spirited opposition on the grounds that the death penalty was barbaric. Churches, universities, unions and a large number of the public and legal professions opposed the death sentence. An estimated 18,000 people participated in street protests and around 15,000 signed a petition against the hanging. The Australian Broadcasting Commission (ABC) suspended radio broadcasts for two minutes as a protest.

Bolte denied all requests for mercy and was determined that Ryan would hang. On the afternoon of the eve of Ryan's hanging, Opas appeared before the trial judge, Justice John Starke, seeking a postponement of the execution due to the opportunity to test new proffered evidence. Opas pleaded with Starke and said, "Why the indecent haste to hang this man until we have tested all possible exculpatory evidence?" Starke, however, rejected the application.

Attorney-General, Sir Arthur Rylah, rejected a second plea to refer Ryan's case to the Full Court under Section 584 of the Crimes Act. A third attempt to save Ryan, in the form of a petition presented at the Crown Solicitor's office pleading for clemency, was also rejected. Close secrecy surrounded all government moves on the Ryan case. That evening, a former Pentridge prisoner, Allan John Cane, arrived in Melbourne from Brisbane in a new bid to save Ryan. An affidavit by Cane, which was presented to Cabinet, says he and seven prisoners were outside the cookhouse when they saw and heard a prison warder fire a shot from the No. 1 guard post at Pentridge Prison the day Hodson was shot. Police had interviewed these prisoners but none were called on at the trial to give evidence. Cane was immediately rushed into conference with his solicitor, Bernard Gaynor, who tried to contact cabinet ministers informing them of Cane's arrival. Gaynor telephoned Government House seeking an audience with the Governor, Sir Rohan Delacombe. However, Gaynor was told by a Government House spokesman that nobody would be answering calls until 9 am (one hour after Ryan's scheduled execution). Gaynor said Cane's mission had failed.

At 23:00, Ryan was informed that his final petition for mercy had been rejected. More than 3,000 people gathered outside Pentridge Prison in protest of the hanging. Shortly before midnight more than 200 police were at the prison to control the demonstrators.

== Execution ==
On the night before the execution, Ryan was transferred to a cell just a few steps away from the gallows trapdoor. Father Brosnan was with him most of this time. At the eleventh hour, Ryan wrote his last letters to his family members, to his defence counsel, to the Anti-Hanging Committee, and to Father Brosnan. The letters were handwritten on toilet paper inside his cell and neatly folded. In the documentary film The Last Man Hanged, Ryan's letter to The Anti-Hanging Committee is read out loud to the public. Ryan wrote: "I state most emphatically that I am not guilty of murder." Ryan's last letter was to his daughters; it contained this line: "With regard to my guilt I say only that I am innocent of intent and have a clear conscience in the matter."

Ryan refused to have any sedatives, but he did have a nip of whisky, and walked calmly onto the gallows trapdoor. Ronald Ryan's last words were to the hangman: "God bless you, please make it quick."

Ryan was hanged in 'D' Division at Pentridge Prison at 8:00 am on Friday 3 February 1967.

A nationwide three-minute silence was observed by Ryan's supporters at the exact time that Ryan was hanged. Ryan's fellow prisoners staged their own protest – they refused to get out of bed, staged a sit-in, refused to work or obey orders. There was an eerie silence throughout the prison.

Later that day, Ryan's body was buried in an unmarked grave within the "D" Division prison facility.

Forty years later in 2007, the Victorian Premier John Brumby granted permission for Ryan's family members to have his body exhumed from Pentridge Prison after Hodson's daughter jumped and danced on Ryan's grave. Ryan's remains were cremated and placed next to his deceased ex-wife in Portland Cemetery.

== Appearance and personality ==
Ryan was a slightly built man who stood 5 ft 8 in (173 cm) tall. He had suffered an injury to his left eye as a child, resulting in a permanent droop of his left eyelid. He favoured expensive clothing, aiming to impress others, and aspired to be known as Australia's leading criminal. He was of above-average intelligence and was described by the people who knew him and prison authorities as a likable character but also a compulsive gambler.

Arresting officer Detective Harding described Ryan as "tough, plausible and particularly difficult to question, he gave nothing away until he realised the game was up".

== Later statements ==
Nineteen years after Ryan's execution, a former warder, Doug Pascoe, claimed on air to Channel 9 and other media that he had fired a shot during Ryan's escape bid. Pascoe said his shot may have accidentally killed his fellow prison guard, Hodson. Pascoe had not told anyone that he fired a shot during the escape because at that time, "I was a 23-year-old coward." In 1986, he tried to sell his story, but his claim was dismissed by police because his rifle had a full magazine after the shooting and he was too far away.

Pascoe's claim was rejected by another former warder, Bill Newman. Newman claimed that he was in Tower 3 the afternoon of the escape and that Pascoe was in Tower 4. Tower 3 was 200 metres from the shooting and Tower 4 was 500 metres away. Police produced a photocopy of the duty roster for the day that showed that Newman was meant to have been in Tower 3 and Pascoe in Tower 4.

Though Opas claimed that the staff duty roster was virtually meaningless on the day of the shooting because prison officers were taking turns sitting in for their colleagues while they attended the annual staff Christmas party, Newman said he returned to his tower (3) at 1.45 pm and later signed statements for the police. According to the duty roster Robert Paterson was not on duty either but in fact he was on duty – he was the one that fired a shot.

Retired prison governor Ian Grindlay said that Ryan told him "straight out" that he had shot but not meant to kill Hodson.

Sister Margaret Kingston of the Good Shepherd Convent in Abbotsford, said Ryan told her that he had shot Hodson, but had not meant to kill him.

=== Eyewitness ===
Twenty-five years after being a witness in Ryan's trial, where he gave evidence claiming to have seen him commit the murder, a man broke his silence, for fear that the alleged killer was becoming a latter-day Ned Kelly. Les Watt wrote to The Australian: "Let me assure you and your readers that Ryan did kill Hodson." Watt spoke out after reading Philip Opas' comments and the latter's autobiography. Watt was one of four witnesses to testify seeing Ryan fire a shot. Watt said that it might well be proper for Opas to leave the bar as his emotional involvement with the case had certainly distorted the facts, leading as it had to the suggestion that Ryan might not have fired the shot that killed Hodson. Watt, on the contrary, said that he saw Ryan take aim and fire and then saw Hodson fall flat on his face and not move. "It was a sickening sight. I also witnessed a slight puff of smoke come from the carbine Ryan used. This was probably as a result of a bullet passing through a well-oiled barrel bore."

== Case for innocence ==
An Australian criminologist, Gordon Hawkins, the director of Sydney University's Institute of Criminology, doubted the damning validity of the "unsigned confessions" of Ryan in a television film documentary, Beyond Reasonable Doubt. Although verbal confessions are not permissible in court, in the 1960s the public—and therefore the jury—were much more trusting of the police. As to whether as a result an innocent man was hanged, there is at least a reasonable doubt following revelations of police corruption uncovered by various Australian police royal commissions. Australian police have to record or tape all interviews they carry out in connection with a crime. The police had no signed evidence of these verbal confessions. Ryan signed only a statement saying that he would not be giving any statements, verbal or written, to anyone except his lawyer. Hawkins questions why Ryan, a seasoned criminal, would suddenly feel the need to tell all to the police.

In 1993, a former Pentridge prisoner, Harold Sheehan, claimed he had witnessed the shooting but had not come forward at the time. Sheehan saw Ryan on his knees when the shot rang out and, therefore, Ryan could not have inflicted the wound that had killed Hodson, which passed in a downward trajectory.

All prison-authorised M1 carbine rifles, including that seized by Ryan from Lange, were issued loaded with eight rounds. Seven of the eight were accounted for in Ryan's case. If the eighth fell onto the floor of the prison watch-tower when Ryan cocked the rifle with the safety catch on, thereby ejecting a live round, then the bullet that killed Hodson must have been fired by a person other than Ryan.

In a letter, "Opas on Ryan – The innocence of Ronald Ryan", written to the Victorian Bar Association and published in the Victorian Bar News (Spring 2002), Opas responded to an assertion made by Julian Burnside, in reviewing Mike Richard's book The Hanged Man, that Ryan was guilty, but that while the verdict was correct the punishment was wrong.

Opas disagreed with this assertion, refusing to believe that at any time Ryan confessed to anyone that he fired a shot and denying the existence of any evidence whatsoever that Ryan ever confessed guilt to anyone, either verbally or in writing.

Ryan gave evidence and swore that he did not fire at Hodson. He denied firing a shot at all. Ryan denied the alleged verbal confessions said to have been made by him. Opas says the last words Ryan said to him were; "We've all got to go sometime, but I don't want to go this way for something I didn't do."

On 26 March 2003, just months prior to his death, Catholic priest Father John Brosnan was asked on ABC Radio by journalist Kellie Day about Ryan, who was believed to have fired the fatal shot during the prison breakout. Brosnan said; "No, I won't make a hero out of him. He caused a situation. I don't know whose bullet killed who, but a friend of mine died. But I'll tell you what, he had heroic qualities." Father Brosnan said. "George was a nice fellow, but his wife had left him, taking their thirteen-year-old daughter with her, and he didn't have much of a life. I used to talk to him at Pentridge and drop in to see him in St Kilda sometimes to cheer him up."

On 1 March 2004, in an interview with the Australian Coalition Against Death Penalty (ACADP), Opas said: "I want to put the record straight. I want the truth told about Ronald Ryan – that an innocent man went to the gallows. I want the truth to be made available to everyone, for anyone young and old, who may want to do research into Ryan's case or research on the issue of capital punishment. I will go to my grave firmly of the opinion that Ronald Ryan did not commit murder. I refuse to believe that at any time he told anyone that he did".

On 23 August 2008, Philip Opas QC, died after a long illness at the age of 91. Opas maintained Ryan's innocence to the end. Opas asked Australian Coalition President Dorina Lisson to keep fighting to clear Ryan's name. According to Ms Lisson, she and others are determined to have Ryan's murder conviction overturned because there is no scientific ballistic forensic evidence to prove Ryan guilty of murder, that a wrongly convicted man was hanged based solely on unsigned unrecorded unproven "hearsay" allegations of verbals/confessions.

For 35 years, Barry Jones, who was a member of both the Victorian and Federal Parliaments refused to comment publicly on Ryan's hanging. Mr Jones broke his silence in 2002 at the launch of Mike Richards' book The Hanged Man. Mr Jones says he remains "unsure" of whether Ryan ever pulled the trigger. "It seemed to me that there was probably a reasonable doubt in the case," he said. Mr Jones, also the former secretary of the Victorian Anti-Hanging Committee says he believes Ryan's hanging was an attempt by then Victorian Premier Henry Bolte, to push his law and order agenda.

Justice Starke, the judge at Ryan's trial and a committed abolitionist, was convinced of Ryan's guilt but did not personally think that he should hang. Until his death in 1992, Starke remained troubled about Ryan's hanging and would often ask his colleagues if they thought he did the right thing. Philip Opas' junior in the trial, Brian Bourke, was filmed in 2005 saying: ″One of the problems of Ryan's trial was an alleged admission that he made on the plane back to the homicide fellows. That sort of thing can't happen now, because they've got to be recorded on tape, but whether he made the admission or was verballed, I don't know. He was a pretty talkative fellow, he might have. I didn't have much doubt about his guilt.″

== Bibliography ==
=== Books ===
- Dickins, Barry, Last Words: The Hanging of Ronald Ryan, Hardie Grant Publications, February 2017, ISBN 9781743792780
- Ayling, Jack, Nothing but the Truth: The life and times of Jack Ayling, Chippendale, Pan MacMillan ISBN 978-0-330-27466-1
- Dickens, Barry, Guts and Pity – The Hanging that ended Capital Punishment in Australia, Currency Press, Sydney, 1996 ISBN 0-86819-424-7
- Grindlay, Ian, Behind Bars: Memoirs of Jail Governor, Ian Grindlay, Southdown Press, Melbourne
- Hansen, Brian, The Awful Truth, Brian Hansen Publications, 2004 ISBN 1-876151-16-1,
- Morton, James & Lobez, Susanna, Dangerous to Know, Melbourne University Press, 2009, ISBN 978-0-522-85681-1
- Opas, Philip, Throw away my wig: an autobiography of a long journey with a few sign posts, 1997 ISBN 1-876074-06-X
- Prior, Tom, Bolte by Bolte, Craftsman Publishing, 1990 ISBN 1-875428-00-3
- Prior, Tom, A knockabout priest: the story of Father John Brosnan, Hargreen, North Melbourne, 1985, ISBN 0-949905-23-2
- Richards, Mike, The Hanged Man – The Life and Death of Ronald Ryan, Scribe Publications, Melbourne, 2002, ISBN 0-908011-94-6
- Sharpe, Alan, The giant book of Crimes that shocked Australia, ISBN 1-86309-018-5
- Silvester, John, Tough; 101 Australian Gangsters, Floradale & Sly Ink, Camberwell, 2002, ISBN 0-9579121-2-9
- Tennison, Patrick, Defence Counsel; Cases in the Career of Philip Opas, Q.C., Hill of Content, Melbourne, 1975, ISBN 0-85572-068-9, pp 96–170.

=== Pamphlets ===
- Whiticker, Alan J., Ronald Ryan: Last Man Hanged, New Holland Publishers Australia, 2013, pp. 26.

=== Plays ===
- The Blood of Helmut Lange – The Unjustified Execution of Ronald Ryan, The Factory Theatre Crime Scenes
- Barry Dickins, Remember Ronald Ryan: A Dramatic Play Currency Press, Sydney, 1994, ISBN 0-86819-392-5
- Barry Dickins, Ryan: A Monologue, La Mama Courthouse, 2015

=== Film and television documentaries ===
- The Last Man Hanged, 1993 historical documentary, Australian Broadcasting Corporation
- The Last of the Ryans, 1997 television movie, Crawford Productions
- Beyond Reasonable Doubt – The Case of Ronald Ryan, 1977 documentary series, Australian Film Commission
- Odd Man Out – The Story of Ronald Ryan, three-part television mini-series
- Who Hung Ronald Ryan? Australian Broadcasting Corporation Film, 1987 documentary film on Ryan's execution
- Real Prison Breaks, 2010 television series,

== Other ==
An Epiphany Window was installed at St James the Great Anglican Church a few weeks after the execution. It was created by the artist Miroslav "Dismas" Zika, who etched an inscription in Latin into the glass towards the base of the window, a translation of which in English is rendered "Dismas made this in 1967 at the beginning of the month when Bolte, scandalous, arrogant, was demanding Ryan suffer capital punishment." Bolte considered this objectionable. Sir Frank Woods, Anglican Archbishop of Melbourne, apologised to the Premier, clarifying that the inscription had neither been included in the original design brief, nor had any "official authorisation", and that the offending inscription would be removed. Zika remained unrepentant.
