= Bill Wheatland =

Australian architect (1927–2013)

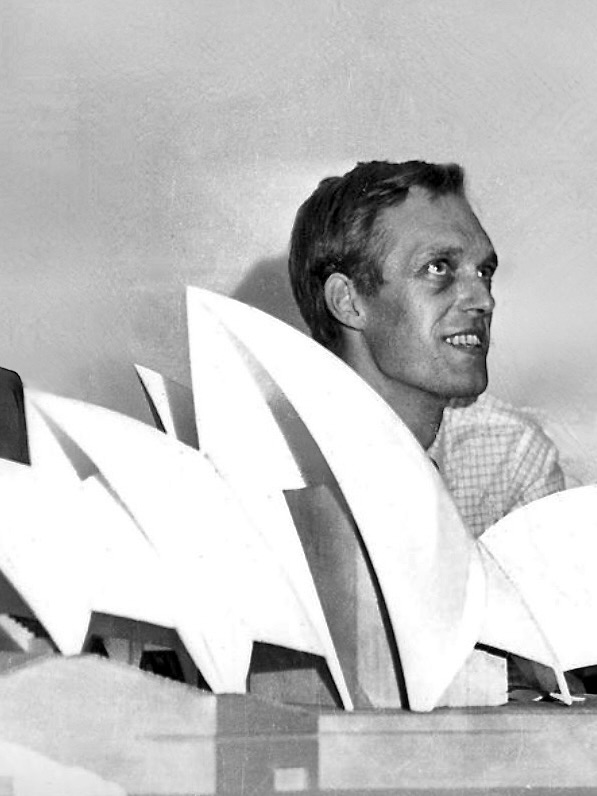
- Wheatland in the 1960s
- Occupation: Architect
- Practice: P&W Planners
- Projects: Sydney Opera House (1963–66); Forest Hill Chase (1957–58); Bell Street Mall (1955–56)

Wilford Charles Arnold “Bill” Wheatland (1927–2013) was an Australian architect best known for his role on the Sydney Opera House project. He served as Jørn Utzon’s principal Australian assistant during the mid-1960s and was largely responsible for managing the Opera House's design documentation.

After the Opera House, Wheatland became chief architect for the Albury‑Wodonga Development Corporation and later directed the proposed National Agridome Centre (1989–1995).

He remained a lifelong proponent of Utzon's vision, preserving many of Utzon's drawings and archives, and was cited among Utzon's loyal collaborators when Utzon received the Pritzker Prize.

== Early life and education ==
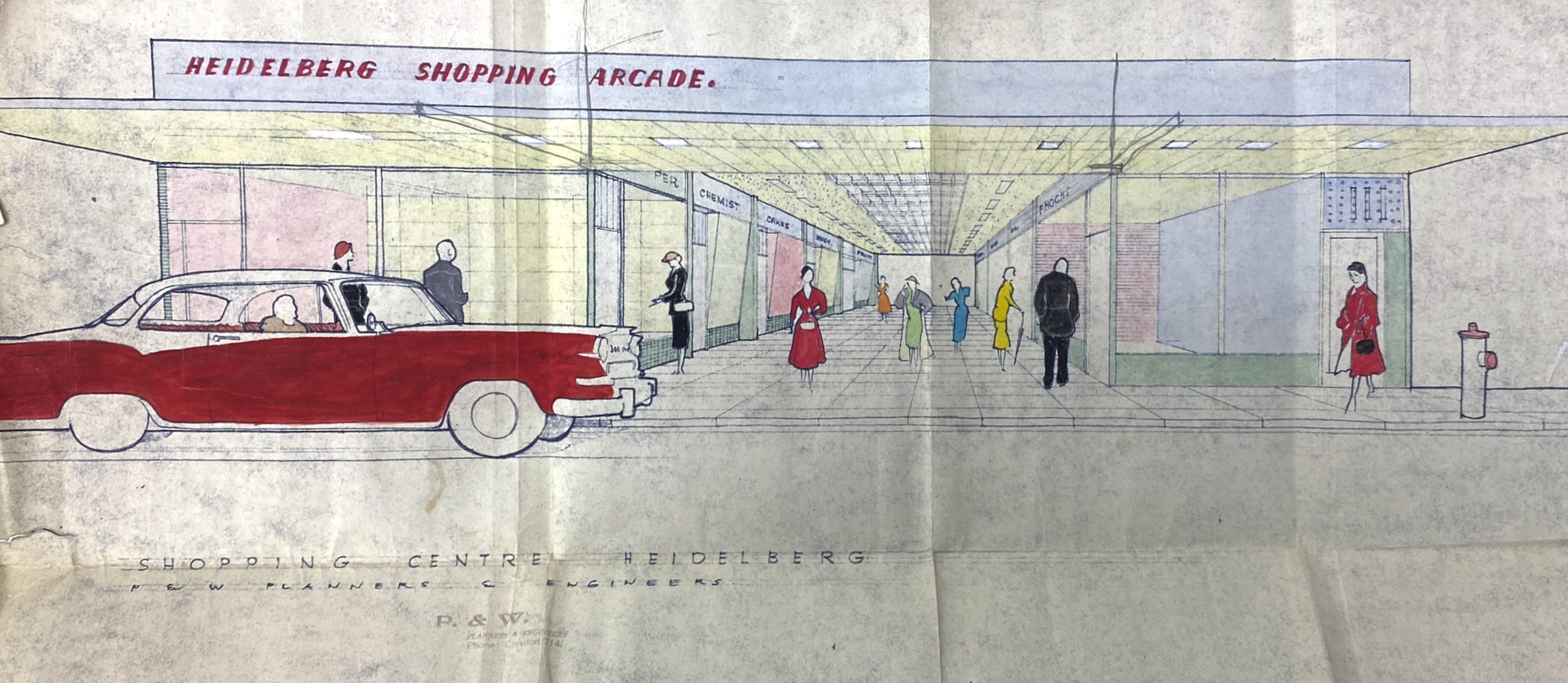
Drawing of Bell Street Mall, c1955

Wheatland was born in Geelong, Victoria, on 23 October 1927. He attended Geelong College and later earned a Bachelor of Architecture from the University of Melbourne in 1953/54. Early in his career he developed a strong interest in Scandinavian design, which would later lead to his connection with Danish architect Jørn Utzon.

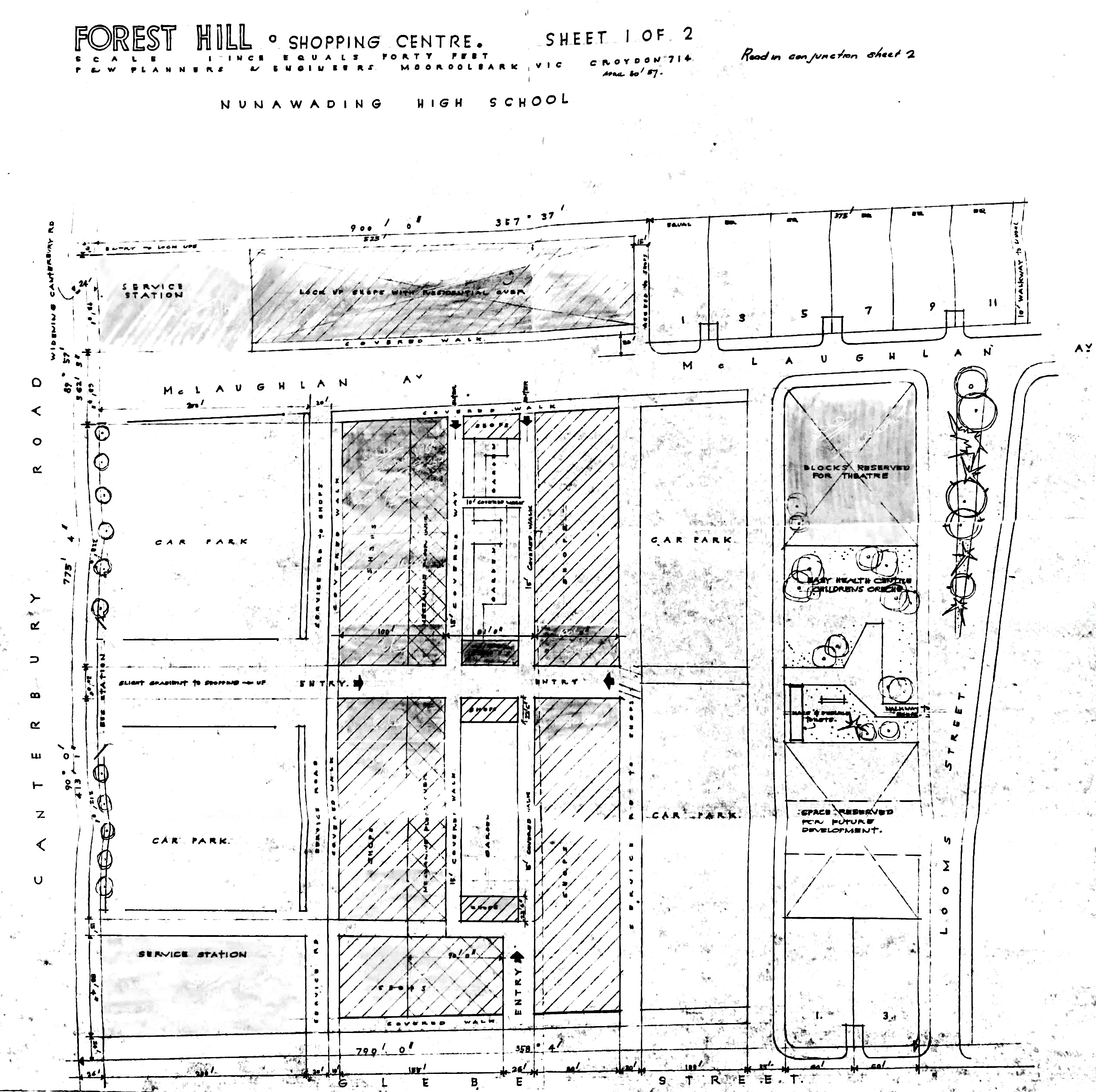
Plan of Forest Hill shopping centre, 1957

== Career ==
After graduating, Wheatland spent several years traveling and working overseas. He lived and practiced in Sweden for about two years, then spent time in England and New York. Upon returning to Australia in the early 1960s, he drew on his Scandinavian influences and arranged an introduction to Jørn Utzon. This led to Wheatland joining Utzon's team on the Sydney Opera House.

In 1963, Wheatland was hired to work on the Opera House design and construction. As associate architect, he managed Utzon's project documentation. According to Sydney Opera House records, Wheatland served as Utzon's principal Australian assistant and senior during Utzon's final years in Sydney. He helped plan and document structural elements, and remained on-site through 1966. After Utzon resigned that year, Wheatland spent several years cleaning up the architect's office, archiving Utzon's drawings and models, and even helping Utzon in his legal fight for unpaid fees.

It was reported that around 5,000 of Utzon's original sketches and drawings were placed in storage by Wheatland and largely went unseen until the 1970s (Wheatland later noted that he ignored Utzon's instructions to burn much of this paperwork, instead preserving it and donating it to the State Library of New South Wales. Wheatland took particular pride that the Opera House's shells and podium were built to Utzon's original design, even though later alterations significantly changed other aspects of the project.

After the Opera House, Wheatland worked in private practice in Sydney for several years. In the mid-1970s he became an architect with the Albury-Wodonga Development Corporation, a regional growth authority for the twin cities on the NSW–Victoria border. In that role he focused on urban planning and housing design. Colleagues noted that he was eager to apply Utzon's ideas about mass residential design to Albury-Wodonga's development.

During this period he also served on the council of Wodonga College of TAFE (1987–1992) and from 1989 to 1995 was director of the National Agridome Centre, a proposed agricultural-science facility in Albury. Wheatland later founded his own firm, Wheatland & Associates, in Albury, while living in nearby Yackandandah. He pursued diverse interests (including flying, skiing, theatre design and opera) and continued working as an architect into his later years.
