= List of acts of the Parliament of Victoria from 1979 =

This is a list of acts of the Parliament of Victoria, Australia for the year 1979.

== 1979 ==
| Short title, or popular name | Citation | Royal assent |
Long title
| Constitution (Governor's Pension) Act 1978 or the Constitution (Governor's Pension) Act 1979 | No. 9251 | 28 February 1979 (Note: This act was reserved for approval by Her Majesty.) |
An Act to provide for the Payment of Pensions to former Governors of the State of Victoria and their Widows, to amend the Constitution Act 1975 (Note: Constitution Act 1975 (No. 8750)) and for other purposes.
| Joint Select Committee (Road Safety) Act 1979 | No. 9252 | 12 June 1979 |
An Act to provide for the Appointment of a Joint Select Committee of the Legislative Council and the Legislative Assembly to Inquire into and Report upon Certain Questions relating to Road Safety, and for other purposes.
| Cattle Compensation Act 1979 | No. 9253 | 12 June 1979 |
An Act to amend the Cattle Compensation Act 1967 (Note: Cattle Compensation Act 1967 (No. 7615)) and the Stamps Act 1958, (Note: Stamps Act 1958 (No. 6375)) and for other purposes.
| Constitution (Local Government) Act 1979 | No. 9254 | 20 June 1979 |
An Act to make Provision in the Victorian Constitution with respect to Local Government, to amend the Constitution Act 1975 and the Local Government Act 1958 (Note: Local Government Act 1958 (No. 6299)) and for other purposes.
| Gas and Fuel Corporation (Borrowing Powers) Act 1979 | No. 9255 | 26 June 1979 |
An Act to amend the Gas and Fuel Corporation Act 1958 (Note: Gas and Fuel Corporation Act 1958 (No. 6260)) and for other purposes.
| Ombudsman (Co-operation) Act 1979 | No. 9256 | 26 June 1979 |
An Act to empower the Ombudsman to furnish Information to Commonwealth and State Ombudsmen and for other purposes.
| Geelong (Haimes Homes) Land Act 1979 | No. 9257 | 26 June 1979 |
An Act to revoke a Grant and Reservation relating to certain Land in the City of Geelong known as the Haimes Homes, to authorize the Granting of certain Land to the Trustees of the Haimes Homes, to authorize the Trustees to sell that Land, to require the Proceeds of any Sale of that Land to be used towards the cost of building, developing and improving Facilities at the Austin Homes, and for other purposes.
| Motor Car (Breath Testing Stations) (Amendment) Act 1979 | No. 9258 | 26 June 1979 |
An Act to amend the Motor Car (Breath Testing Stations) Act 1976. (Note: Motor Car (Breath Testing Stations) Act 1976 (No. 8865))
| Geelong Waterworks and Sewerage (Trust) Act 1979 | No. 9259 | 26 June 1979 |
An Act to make further Provision with respect to the Constitution of the Geelong Waterworks and Sewerage Trust, to amend the Geelong Waterworks and Sewerage Act 1958 (Note: Geelong Waterworks and Sewerage Act 1958 (No. 6263)) and for other purposes.
| Bright (Land Exchange) Act 1979 | No. 9260 | 26 June 1979 |
An Act to provide for the Exchange of certain Lands in the Township of Bright and for other purposes.
| Supply (1979-80, No. 1) Act 1979 | No. 9261 | 29 June 1979 |
An Act to make Interim Provision for the Appropriation of Moneys out of the Consolidated Fund for the Service of the Financial Year 1979–80.
| Money Lenders (Fees) Act 1979 | No. 9262 | 3 July 1979 |
An Act to amend the Money Lenders Act 1958 (Note: Money Lenders Act 1958 (No. 6324)) to increase Fees payable with respect to Money Lenders' Licences and other matters.
| Exhibition (Amendment) Act 1979 (repealed) | No. 9263 | 3 July 1978 |
An Act to alter the method of appointing members of the Exhibition Trust, to provide increased borrowing powers for the Trust, to amend the Exhibition Act 1957 (Note: Exhibition Act 1957 (No. 6120)) and for other purposes. (Repealed by Statute Law (Further Revision) Act 2006 (No. 29 of 2006))
| Health (Cattle) Act 1979 | No. 9264 | 3 July 1979 |
An Act to amend section 83 of the Health Act 1958 (Note: Health Act 1958 (No. 6270)) and for other purposes.
| Margarine (Amendment) Act 1979 (repealed) | No. 9267 | 12 July 1979 |
An Act to amend the Margarine Act 1975, (Note: Margarine Act 1975 (No. 8720)) and for other purposes connected therewith. (Repealed by Statute Law Revision (Repeals) Act 1999 (No. 3 of 1999))
| Youth, Sport and Recreation (State Youth Council) Act 1979 | No. 9268 | 10 July 1979 |
An Act to amend the Youth, Sport and Recreation Act 1972 (Note: Youth, Sport and Recreation Act 1972 (No. 8344)) to increase the membership of the State Youth Council.
| Racing (Restricted Trotting Meetings) Act 1979 | No. 9269 | 10 July 1979 |
An Act to amend the Racing Act 1958. (Note: Racing Act 1958 (No. 6353))
| State Electricity Commission (Morwell Land Compensation) Act 1979 | No. 9270 | 10 July 1979 |
An Act to amend the State Electricity Commission Act 1958 (Note: State Electricity Commission Act 1958 (No. 6377)) to make Provision with respect to the Compensation payable for Land in the vicinity of Morwell and for other Purposes.
| Construction Safety Act 1979 | No. 9271 | 10 July 1979 |
An Act to re-enact with Amendments the Law relating to the Use of Scaffolding and certain Machinery and the Safety of Workmen engaged in Building and Construction Work, to amend the Labour and Industry Act 1958 (Note: Labour and Industry Act 1958 (No. 6283)) and for other purposes.
| Business Franchise (Petroleum Products) Act 1979 | No. 9272 | 10 July 1979 |
An Act with respect to the licensing of Persons who sell certain Petroleum Products in Victoria, to amend various Acts and for other purposes.
| Albury-Wodonga Agreement (Amendment) Act 1979 | No. 9273 | 10 July 1979 |
An Act to provide for the Reconstitution of the Albury-Wodonga (Victoria) Corporation, to approve the Albury-Wodonga Area Development Agreement Amendment Agreement (No. 1) made between the Commonwealth and the States of Victoria and New South Wales, to amend the Albury-Wodonga Agreement Act 1973 (Note: Albury-Wodonga Agreement Act 1973 (No. 8520)) and the State Development Decentralization and Tourism Act 1978 (Note: State Development Decentralization and Tourism Act 1978 (No. 9126)) and for other purposes.
| City of Melbourne (Re-subdivision) Act 1979 | No. 9274 | 10 July 1979 |
An Act to make further Provision with respect to the Re-subdivision of the Municipal District of the City of Melbourne.
| Co-operation Act 1979 | No. 9275 | 10 July 1979 |
An Act to amend the Co-operation Act 1958 (Note: Co-operation Act 1958 (No. 6225)) and for other purposes.
| Cemeteries (Melbourne General Cemetery) Act 1979 | No. 9276 | 10 July 1979 |
An Act to amend Part III. of the Cemeteries Act 1958. (Note: Cemeteries Act 1958 (No. 6217))
| River Improvement (Trusts and Valuations) Act 1979 | No. 9278 | 10 July 1979 |
An Act to amend the River Improvement Act 1958 (Note: River Improvement Act 1958 (No. 6358)) with respect to the Constitution of River Improvement Trusts and Estimates and Valuations, and for other purposes.
| Instruments (Writs) Act 1979 | No. 9279 | 10 July 1979 |
An Act to amend the Second Schedule to the Instruments Act 1958 (Note: Instruments Act 1958 (No. 6279)) with respect to the Form of the Writ of Summons upon a Bill of Exchange.
| Forests (Reserved Land) Act 1979 | No. 9280 | 10 July 1979 |
An Act to amend the Forests Act 1958. (Note: Forests Act 1958 (No. 6254))
| Trinity College Act 1979 | No. 9281 | 10 July 1979 |
An Act to incorporate Trinity College, being a college affiliated to and connected with the University of Melbourne, to dissolve The Trinity College (Melbourne) Trusts Corporation, to amend the Janet Clarke Hall Act 1961 (Note: Janet Clarke Hall Act 1961 (No. 6752)) and for other purposes.
| Revocation and Excision of Crown Reservations Act 1979 | No. 9282 | 10 July 1979 |
An Act to revoke the Permanent Reservations of certain Lands and for Purposes connected therewith.
| Tattersall Consultations (Amendment) Act 1979 | No. 9284 | 24 July 1979 |
An Act to amend section 6 of the Tattersall Consultations Act 1958. (Note: Tattersall Consultations Act 1958 (No. 6390))
| Prahran Market Act 1979 | No. 9285 | 2 October 1979 |
An Act to confirm certain actions of the City of Prahran in relation to the Prahran Market and for other purposes.
| Water Authorities (Constitution and Powers) Act 1979 | No. 9290 | 16 October 1979 |
An Act to amend the Water Act 1958 (Note: Water Act 1958 (No. 6413)) and for other purposes.
| Sewerage Authorities (Constitution and Powers) Act 1979 | No. 9291 | 16 October 1979 |
An Act to make further Provision with respect to the Constitution and Powers of Sewerage Authorities, to amend the Sewerage Districts Act 1958 (Note: Sewerage Districts Act 1958 (No. 6368)) and for other purposes.
| Wrongs (Defamation) Act 1979 | No. 9292 | 23 October 1979 |
An Act to amend the Wrongs Act 1958 (Note: Wrongs Act 1958 (No. 6420)) in relation to Defamatory Words and Libel.
| Judges Salaries Act 1979 | No. 9293 | 23 October 1979 |
An Act to amend the Constitution Act 1975 and the County Court Act 1958 (Note: County Court Act 1958 (No. 6230)) with respect to the Salaries of Judges.
| Business Franchise (Petroleum Products) (Licence Fees) Act 1979 | No. 9295 | 30 October 1979 |
An Act to amend the Business Franchise (Petroleum Products) Act 1979 (Note: Business Franchise (Petroleum Products) Act 1979 (No. 9272)) to make Provision with respect to the payment of Licence Fees and for other purposes.
| State Electricity Commission (Amendment) Act 1979 | No. 9296 | 7 November 1979 |
An Act to amend the State Electricity Commission Act 1958 and the Electric Light and Power Act 1958, (Note: Electric Light and Power Act 1958 (No. 6241)) and for other purposes.
| Workers Compensation (Miscellaneous Provisions) Act 1979 | No. 9297 | 27 November 1979 |
An Act to amend the Workers Compensation Act 1958 (Note: Workers Compensation Act 1958 (No. 6419)) and for other purposes.
| Motor Car (Surcharge) Act 1979 | No. 9298 | 27 November 1979 |
An Act to amend the Motor Car Act 1958 (Note: Motor Car Act 1958 (No. 6325)) in relation to the Surcharge on certain Insurance Premiums.
| Unclaimed Moneys Act 1979 | No. 9299 | 27 November 1979 |
An Act to amend the Unclaimed Moneys Act 1962. (Note: Unclaimed Moneys Act 1962 (No. 6879))
| Land Tax Act 1979 | No. 9300 | 27 November 1979 |
An Act to amend the Land Tax Act 1958. (Note: Land Tax Act 1958 (No. 6289))
| Business Franchise (Tobacco) Act 1979 | No. 9301 | 30 November 1979 |
An Act to amend the Business Franchise (Tobacco) Act 1974. (Note: Business Franchise (Tobacco) Act 1974 (No. 8597))
| Public Authorities (Contributions) Act 1979 | No. 9302 | 30 November 1979 |
An Act to increase the Contributions payable by certain Public Authorities under the Public Authorities (Contributions) Act 1966. (Note: Public Authorities (Contributions) Act 1966 (No. 7441))
| Appropriation (1979-80, No. 1) Act 1979 | No. 9303 | 30 November 1979 |
An Act to appropriate certain Sums out of the Consolidated Fund for the Service of the Financial Year 1979-80 and to appropriate the Supplies granted in this Session of Parliament and for other purposes.
| Pay-roll Tax Act 1979 | No. 9305 | 4 December 1979 |
An Act to alter the general exemption from Liability to Pay-roll Tax, to amend the Pay-roll Tax Act 1971 (Note: Pay-roll Tax Act 1971 (No. 8154)) and the Pay-roll Tax Act 1978 (Note: Pay-roll Tax Act 1978 (No. 9192)) and for other purposes.
| Transport Works and Services Act 1979 | No. 9306 | 11 December 1979 |
An Act to authorize Expenditure on Works and Services and other Purposes relating to Railways and other services.
| Melbourne and Metropolitan Tramways (Borrowing Powers) Act 1979 | No. 9307 | 11 December 1979 |
An Act to increase the limit of the Borrowing Powers of the Melbourne and Metropolitan Tramways Board and for other purposes.
| County Court (Jurisdiction) Act 1979 | No. 9308 | 11 December 1979 |
An Act to extend the Jurisdiction of the County Court in relation to certain Civil Matters and for other purposes.
| State Forests Works and Services Act 1979 | No. 9309 | 11 December 1979 |
An Act to authorize Expenditure on Works and Services and other purposes relating to State Forests.
| Young Men's Christian Association of Ballarat (Guarantee) Act 1979 | No. 9310 | 11 December 1979 |
An Act to authorize the Treasurer of Victoria to guarantee the Repayment of certain Moneys proposed to be borrowed by the Young Men's Christian Association of Ballarat and for other purposes.
| Water Supply Works and Services Act 1979 (repealed) | No. 9311 | 11 December 1979 |
An Act to authorize Expenditure on Works and Services and other Purposes relating to Irrigation Water Supply Drainage Sewerage Flood Protection and River Improvement, and other purposes. (Repealed by Treasury Legislation (Repeal) Act 2005 (No. 73 of 2005))
| Trustee Companies (Trustees Executors) Act 1979 | No. 9312 | 11 December 1979 |
An Act to vary the restrictions imposed in relation to the Capital and Shares to The Trustees Executors and Agency Company Limited, to amend the Second Schedule to the Trustee Companies Act 1958 (Note: Trustee Companies Act 1958 (No. 6402)) and for other purposes.
| Commercial Goods Vehicles (Aviation Fuel) Act 1979 (repealed) | No. 9313 | 11 December 1979 |
An Act to amend Section 5 and Section 13 of the Commercial Goods Vehicles Act 1958 (Note: Commercial Goods Vehicles Act 1958 (No. 6222)) with respect to the Carriage of Aviation Turbine Fuel to the Melbourne Airport at Tullamarine. (Repealed by Statute Law Revision Act 1995 (No. 11 of 1995))
| Victorian Development Corporation (Powers) Act 1979 | No. 9314 | 11 December 1979 |
Ah Act to amend the Victorian Development Corporation Act 1973 (Note: Victorian Development Corporation Act 1973 (No. 8428)) to make Provision with respect to the Corporation and for other purposes.
| Town and Country Planning (Planning Schemes) Act 1979 | No. 9315 | 18 December 1979 |
An Act to make provision with respect to the Operation and Validity of Certain Planning Schemes, to amend the Town and Country Planning Act 1961 (Note: Town and Country Planning Act 1961 (No. 6849)) and for other purposes.
| Victorian Government Travel Authority (Reconstitution) Act 1979 | No. 9316 | 18 December 1979 |
An Act to amend the Victorian Government Travel Authority Act 1977 (Note: Victorian Government Travel Authority Act 1977 (No. 9083)) to make Provision with respect to the Reconstitution of the Authority and for other purposes.
| Stamps (Amendment) Act 1979 | No. 9317 | 18 December 1979 |
An Act to amend the Stamps Act 1958.
| Motor Car (Fees) Act 1979 | No. 9318 | 18 December 1979 |
An Act to amend the Motor Car Act 1958 with respect to the Amount of Registration Fees and certain other Fees payable under that Act, to amend the Stamps Act 1958, and for other purposes.
| Racing (Financial Provisions) Act 1979 | No. 9319 | 18 December 1979 |
An Act to make Provision with respect to the Commissions deducted from Trifecta Totalizators, the Borrowing Powers of the Totalizator Agency Board and for other purposes.
| Urban Land Authority Act 1979 | No. 9320 | 18 December 1979 |
An Act to establish an Urban Land Authority to make Provision with respect to the Functions and Powers of the Authority and for other purposes.
| Public Works and Services Act 1979 | No. 9321 | 18 December 1979 |
An Act to authorize Expenditure on Public Works and Services and for other purposes.
| Second-hand Dealers (Closing Hours) Act 1979 | No. 9322 | 18 December 1979 |
An Act to amend the Second-hand Dealers Act 1958. (Note: Second-hand Dealers Act 1958 (No. 6363))
| Transfer of Land (Amendment) Act 1979 | No. 9324 | 18 December 1979 |
An Act to amend the Transfer of Land Act 1958 (Note: Transfer of Land Act 1958 (No. 6399)) and for other purposes.
| Melbourne College of Divinity Act 1979 | No. 9325 | 18 December 1979 |
An Act to amend the Melbourne College of Divinity Act 1910 (Note: Melbourne College of Divinity Act 1910 (1 Geo. V. No. 2275)) and for other purposes.
| Transport Regulation (Car Pools) Act 1979 | No. 9326 | 18 December 1979 |
An Act to amend the Transport Regulation Act 1958 (Note: Transport Regulation Act 1958 (No. 6400)) and for other purposes.
| Local Authorities Superannuation Act 1979 | No. 9329 | 18 December 1979 |
An Act to amend the Local Authorities Superannuation Act 1958, (Note: Local Authorities Superannuation Act 1958 (No. 6298)) and for other purposes.
| Young Farmers' Finance Council Act 1979 | No. 9333 | 18 December 1979 |
An Act to establish a Young Farmers' Finance Council and to amend the Rural Finance Act 1958. (Note: Rural Finance Corporation Act 1958 (No. 6360))
| Probate Duty Act 1979 | No. 9334 | 18 December 1979 |
An Act to amend the Probate Duty Act 1962, (Note: Probate Duty Act 1962 (No. 6890)) and for other purposes.
| Railways (Board) Act 1979 | No. 9335 | 18 December 1979 |
An Act to amend the Railways Act 1958 (Note: Railways Act 1958 (No. 6355)) with respect to the Membership and Procedure of the Victorian Railways Board, and for other purposes.
| Trustee Companies (Amendment) Act 1979 | No. 9339 | 18 December 1979 |
An Act to amend the Trustee Companies Act 1958 with respect to the Power of Directors of Trustee Companies to refuse to register Transfers of Shares, to limit the Power of Subsidiaries of Trustee Companies to act as Estate Agents, and for other purposes.
| Canned Fruits Marketing Act 1979 | No. 9341 | 20 December 1979 |
An Act relating to the Marketing of certain Canned Fruits, and for related purposes.
| Marine (Amendment) Act 1979 | No. 9342 | 20 December 1979 |
An Act to amend the Marine Act 1958 (Note: Marine Act 1958 (No. 6302)) and the Marine {Amendment) Act 1976. (Note: Marine (Amendment) Act 1976 (No. 8924))
| Shire of Omeo (Tourist Gold Mine) Act 1979 | No. 9342 | 20 December 1979 |
An Act to authorize the Granting to the Corporation of the Shire of Omeo of an Exploration Licence and a Gold Mining Lease under the Mines Act 1958 (Note: Mines Act 1958 (No. 6320)) in respect of certain Crown Lands reserved for Public Purposes, to authorize the said Corporation to enter into Agreements in respect of any such Licence or Lease and for other purposes.
| Presbyterian Trusts Act 1979 | No. 9344 | 20 December 1979 |
An Act to make further Provision with respect to the Division of certain Property in accordance with The Uniting Church in Australia Act 1977 (Note: Uniting Church in Australia Act 1977 (No. 9021)) and Part III. of the Schedule to the Presbyterian Church of Australia Act 1971, (Note: Presbyterian Church of Australia Act 1971 (No. 8102)) to amend the Presbyterian Trusts Act 1890 (Note: Presbyterian Trusts Act 1890 (54 Vict. No. 1175)) and for other purposes.
| Railway Construction and Property Board Act 1979 (repealed) | No. 9345 | 20 December 1979 |
An Act to reconstitute the Railway Construction Board as the Railway Construction and Property Board, to confer additional functions on that Board, to make better Provision for the Development and Management of Railway Land not used directly for Railway purposes, to make further provision for railway housing, to amend the Railways Act 1958, (Note: Railways Act 1958 (No. 6355)) the Melbourne Underground Rail Loop Act 1970, (Note: Melbourne Underground Rail Loop Act 1970 (No. 8023)) the Land Act 1958 (Note: Land Act 1958 (No. 6284)) and the Ministry of Transport Act 1958 (Note: Ministry of Transport Act 1958 (No. 6322)) and for other purposes. (Repealed by Transport Act 1983 (No. 9921))
| Motor Car (Insurance by Pensioners) Act 1979 | No. 9346 | 20 December 1979 |
An Act to amend Section 71 of the Motor Car Act 1958.
| Town and Country Planning (Amendment of Schemes) Act 1979 (repealed) | No. 9347 | 20 December 1979 |
An Act to amend the Town and Country Planning Act 1961 to make Provision with respect to the Amendment of Planning Schemes by the Governor in Council and for other purposes. (Repealed by Statute Law Revision (Repeals) Act 1999 (No. 3 of 1999))
| Magistrates' Courts (Civil Jurisdiction) Act 1979 | No. 9349 | 20 December 1979 |
An Act to repeal the Magistrates' Courts (Amendment) Act 1978, (Note: Magistrates' Courts (Amendment) Act 1978 (No. 9152)) to amend the Magistrates' Courts Act 1971 (Note: Magistrates' Courts Act 1971 (No. 8184)) and the Magistrates (Summary Proceedings) Act 1975 (Note: Magistrates (Summary Proceedings) Act 1975 (No. 8731)) with respect to the Civil Jurisdiction of Magistrates' Courts, to amend the Water Act 1958, and for purposes connected therewith.
| Master Builders' Association of Victoria (Guarantee) Act 1979 | No. 9350 | 20 December 1979 |
An Act to authorize the Treasurer of Victoria to Guarantee certain Moneys proposed to be borrowed by the Master Builders' Association of Victoria and for other purposes.
| Educational Grants (Continuation) Act 1979 | No. 9352 | 20 December 1979 |
An Act to amend the Educational Grants Act 1973. (Note: Educational Grants Act 1973 (No. 8495))
| Wrongs (Assessment of Damages) Act 1979 | No. 9353 | 20 December 1979 |
An Act to make Provision with respect to the Assessment of Damages, to amend the Wrongs Act 1958 and for other purposes.
| Victorian Arts Centre Act 1979 | No. 9354 | 20 December 1979 |
An Act to constitute the Victorian Arts Centre Trust, to make provision with respect to the Management and Operation of the Victorian Arts Centre and for the Use and Promotion of the Theatre Complex in the Centre and for other purposes.
| Local Government (Land Liable to Flooding) Act 1979 | No. 9356 | 20 December 1979 |
An Act to amend the Local Government Act 1958, the Dandenong Valley Authority Act 1963, (Note: Dandenong Valley Authority Act 1963 (No. 7060)) the Drainage of Land Act 1975, (Note: Drainage of Land Act 1975 (No. 8811)) and for other purposes.
| Parliamentary Committees (Public Accounts and Expenditure Review Committee) Act 1979 | No. 9357 | 20 December 1979 |
An Act to make Provision with respect to the Establishment of a Joint Select Committee of the Legislative Council and the Legislative Assembly to review the Public Accounts and Public Expenditure of Victoria and for other purposes.
| Health (Proprietary Medicines) Act 1979 (repealed) | No. 9359 | 20 December 1979 |
An Act to amend Part XIV. of the Health Act 1958 and for other purposes. (Repealed by Statute Law Revision (Repeals) Act 1982 (No. 9863))
| Victorian Fishing Industry Council Act 1979 | No. 9360 | 20 December 1979 |
An Act to establish a Victorian Fishing Industry Council and to amend section 3 (1) of the Local Authorities Superannuation Act 1958, the Fisheries Act 1968 (Note: Fisheries Act 1968 (No. 7780)) and the Ministry for Conservation Act 1972. (Note: Ministry for Conservation Act 1972 (No. 8364))
| Grain Handling Improvement Authorities Act 1979 | No. 9361 | 20 December 1979 |
An Act to establish certain Authorities to undertake the Development and Construction of various Improvements in relation to the Transport and Storage of Grain in Victoria and for other purposes.
| Wheat Marketing Act 1979 | No. 9362 | 20 December 1979 |
An Act relating to the Marketing of Wheat, and for other purposes.
| State Employees Retirement Benefits Act 1979 | No. 9363 | 20 December 1979 |
An Act to constitute a State Employees Retirement Benefits Board, to make Provision for the Administration by the Board of a State Employees Retirement Benefits Fund and for other purposes.
| Town and Country Planning (General Amendment) Act 1979 (repealed) | No. 9364 | 20 December 1979 |
An Act to amend the Town and Country Planning Act 1961, the State Co-ordination Council Act 1975 (Note: State Co-ordination Council Act 1975 (No. 8793)) and the Geelong Regional Commission Act 1977 (Note: Geelong Regional Commission Act 1977 (No. 9024)) and for other purposes. (Repealed by Statute Law Revision (Repeals) Act 1999 (No. 3 of 1999))
| Industrial Relations Act 1979 | No. 9365 | 20 December 1979 |
An Act to constitute an Industrial Relations Commission of Victoria, to make Provision for the Constitution of Conciliation and Arbitration Boards, to make Provision with respect to the Recognition of Industrial Associations, to make Provision with respect to certain Conditions of Employment, to amend the Labour and Industry Act 1958 and the Industrial Training Act 1975 (Note: Industrial Training Act 1975 (No. 8706)) and the Building Industry Long Service Leave Act 1975 (Note: Building Industry Long Service Leave Act 1975 (No. 8693)) and for other purposes.
| Abattoir and Meat Inspection (Amendment) Act 1979 | No. | |
| Barley Marketing (Amendment) Act 1979 | No. | |
| Building Industry Long Service Leave (Amendment) Act 1979 | No. | |
| Community Welfare Services (Amendment) Act 1979 | No. | |
| Crimes (Amendment) Act 1979 | No. | |
| Education (Amendment) Act 1979 | No. | |
| Egg Industry Stabilization (Amendment) Act 1979 | No. | |
| Fisheries (Amendment) Act 1979 | No. | |
| Geelong Regional Commission (Amendment) Act 1979 | No. | |
| Gift Duty (Amendment) Act 1979 | No. | |
| Labour and Industry (Amendment) Act 1979 | No. | |
| Latrobe Valley (Amendment) Act 1979 | No. | |
| Legal Profession Practice (Amendment) Act 1979 | No. | |
| Liquor Control (Amendment) Act 1979 | No. | |
| Local Government (Amendment) Act 1979 | No. | |
| Melbourne and Metropolitan Board of Works (Amendment) Act 1979 | No. | |
| Ministry of Transport (Amendment) Act 1979 | No. | |
| Motor Accidents (Amendment) Act 1979 | No. | |
| Pharmacists (Amendment) Act 1979 | No. | |
| Poisons (Amendment) Act 1979 | No. | |
| Public Service (Amendment) Act 1979 | No. | |
| Superannuation (Amendment) Act 1979 | No. | |
| Vermin and Noxious Weeds (Amendment) Act 1979 | No. | |
| Victorian Public Offices Corporation (Amendment) Act 1979 | No. | |

== Sources ==
- "1979 Victorian Historical Acts". AustLII.
