= List of acts of the Parliament of Victoria from 2013 =

This is a list of acts of the Parliament of Victoria, Australia for the year 2013.

== 2013 ==
Short title, or popular name	Citation	Royal assent
Long title
Liquor Control Reform Amendment Act 2013	No. 1 of 2013	12 February 2013
An Act to make various amendments to the Liquor Control Reform Act 1998 (Note: Liquor Control Reform Act 1998 (No. 94 of 1998)) and for other purposes.
Retirement Villages Amendment (Information Disclosure) Act 2013	No. 2 of 2013	
Planning and Environment Amendment (General) Act 2013	No. 3 of 2013	
Traditional Owner Settlement Amendment Act 2013	No. 4 of 2013	
Courts Legislation Amendment (Reserve Judicial Officers) Act 2013	No. 5 of 2013	
Crimes Amendment (Gross Violence Offences) Act 2013	No. 6 of 2013	
Electronic Conveyancing (Adoption of National Law) Act 2013	No. 7 of 2013	
Health Services Amendment (Health Purchasing Victoria) Act 2013	No. 8 of 2013	
Co-operatives National Law Application Act 2013	No. 9 of 2013	13 March 2013
An Act to provide for the application of a national law relating to the formation, registration and operation of co-operatives, to repeal the Co-operatives Act 1996 (Note: Co-operatives Act 1996 (No. 84 of 1996)) and to make related amendments to other Acts and for other purposes.
Corrections Amendment Act 2013	No. 10 of 2013	
Energy Legislation Amendment (Flexible Pricing and Other Matters) Act 2013	No. 11 of 2013	
Jury Directions Act 2013	No. 12 of 2013	
Statute Law Amendment (Directors' Liability) Act 2013	No. 13 of 2013	
Education and Training Reform Amendment (Teacher Registration and Other Matters) Act 2013	No. 14 of 2013	
Justice Legislation Amendment (Cancellation of Parole and Other Matters) Act 2013	No. 15 of 2013	
Major Sporting Events Amendment Act 2013	No. 16 of 2013	
Alpine Resorts and National Parks Acts Amendment Act 2013	No. 17 of 2013	
Assisted Reproductive Treatment Amendment Act 2013	No. 18 of 2013	
Company Titles (Home Units) Act 2013	No. 19 of 2013	
Crimes Amendment (Integrity in Sports) Act 2013	No. 20 of 2013	
Planning and Environment Amendment (Growth Areas Authority and Miscellaneous) Act 2013	No. 21 of 2013	
Rail Safety National Law Application Act 2013	No. 22 of 2013	23 April 2013
An Act to make provision for a national system of rail safety and to make related amendments to other Acts and for other purposes.
Transport Legislation Amendment (Rail Safety Local Operations and Other Matters) Act 2013	No. 23 of 2013	
Water Legislation Amendment Act 2013	No. 24 of 2013	
Adoption Amendment Act 2013	No. 25 of 2013	
Corrections Further Amendment Act 2013	No. 26 of 2013	
Gambling Regulation Amendment Act 2013	No. 27 of 2013	
Integrity Legislation Amendment Act 2013	No. 28 of 2013	
Parliamentary Committees Amendment Act 2013	No. 29 of 2013	
Heavy Vehicle National Law Application Act 2013	No. 30 of 2013	4 June 2013
An Act to provide for the application of a National Law to regulate the use of heavy vehicles, to make related and consequential amendments to other Acts and for other purposes.
Justice Legislation Amendment Act 2013	No. 31 of 2013	
Sentencing Amendment (Abolition of Suspended Sentences and Other Matters) Act 2013	No. 32 of 2013	
Aboriginal Lands Amendment Act 2013	No. 33 of 2013	
Building and Planning Legislation Amendment (Governance and Other Matters) Act 2013	No. 34 of 2013	
Energy Legislation Amendment (Feed-in Tariffs and Other Matters) Act 2013	No. 35 of 2013	
Marine (Domestic Commercial Vessel National Law Application) Act 2013	No. 36 of 2013	18 June 2013
An Act to adopt in Victoria a national approach to the regulation of marine safety in relation to domestic commercial vessels, to make consequential amendments to the Marine Safety Act 2010, (Note: Marine Safety Act 2010 (No. 65 of 2010)) to make consequential amendments to other Acts and for other purposes.
Parliamentary and Public Administration Legislation Amendment Act 2013	No. 37 of 2013	
Appropriation (2013-2014) Act 2013	No. 38 of 2013	28 June 2013
An Act for the appropriation of certain sums out of the Consolidated Fund for the ordinary annual services of the Government for the financial year 2013/2014 and for other purposes.
Appropriation (Parliament 2013-2014) Act 2013	No. 39 of 2013	28 June 2013
An Act for the appropriation of certain sums out of the Consolidated Fund for the Parliament in respect of the financial year 2013/2014 and for other purposes.
Borrowing and Investment Powers Amendment Act 2013	No. 40 of 2013	
State Tax Laws Amendment (Budget and Other Measures) Act 2013	No. 41 of 2013	
Sustainable Forests (Timber) Amendment Act 2013	No. 42 of 2013	
Transport Legislation Amendment (Foundation Taxi and Hire Car Reforms) Act 2013	No. 43 of 2013	
Bail Amendment Act 2013	No. 44 of 2013	
National Parks Amendment (Leasing Powers and Other Matters) Act 2013	No. 45 of 2013	
Corrections Amendment (Breach of Parole) Act 2013	No. 46 of 2013	
Education and Training Reform Amendment (School Attendance) Act 2013	No. 47 of 2013	
Fortification Removal Act 2013	No. 48 of 2013	10 September 2013
An Act to provide for the Magistrates' Court, on application by the Chief Commissioner of Police, to require the removal or modification of fortifications on premises that are connected to certain criminal offences and for other purposes.
Major Transport Projects Facilitation Amendment (East West Link and Other Projects) Act 2013	No. 49 of 2013	10 September 2013
University of Ballarat Amendment (Federation University Australia) Act 2013	No. 50 of 2013	10 September 2013
An Act to amend the University of Ballarat Act 2010 (Note: University of Ballarat Act 2010 (No. 5 of 2010)) to change the name of the University of Ballarat to Federation University Australia and for other purposes.
Catchment and Land Protection Amendment Act 2013	No. 51 of 2013	
Children, Youth and Families Amendment Act 2013	No. 52 of 2013	
Local Government (Rural City of Wangaratta) Act 2013	No. 53 of 2013	
Plant Biosecurity Amendment Act 2013	No. 54 of 2013	
Road Legislation Amendment (Use and Disclosure of Information and Other Matters) Act 2013	No. 55 of 2013	
Road Safety and Sentencing Acts Amendment Act 2013	No. 56 of 2013	
Consumer Affairs Legislation Amendment Act 2013	No. 57 of 2013	
Open Courts Act 2013	No. 58 of 2013	22 October 2013
An Act to reform and consolidate provisions for and powers relating to suppression orders and closed court orders, to make consequential amendments to various Acts and for other purposes.
Radiation Amendment Act 2013	No. 59 of 2013	22 October 2013
Succession to the Crown (Request) Act 2013	No. 60 of 2013	22 October 2013
An Act to request the Parliament of the Commonwealth to enact under section 51(xxxviii) of the Constitution of the Commonwealth an Act to change the law relating to royal succession and royal marriages, and to make consequential amendments to the Crimes Act 1958 (Note: Crimes Act 1958 (No. 6231)) and the Imperial Acts Application Act 1980. (Note: Imperial Acts Application Act 1980 (No. 9426))
Superannuation Legislation Amendment Act 2013	No. 61 of 2013	
Corrections Amendment (Parole Reform) Act 2013	No. 62 of 2013	
Courts Legislation Amendment (Judicial Officers) Act 2013	No. 63 of 2013	
Fisheries Amendment Act 2013	No. 64 of 2013	
Professional Boxing and Combat Sports Amendment Act 2013	No. 65 of 2013	
Tobacco Amendment Act 2013	No. 66 of 2013	
Workplace Injury Rehabilitation and Compensation Act 2013	No. 67 of 2013	12 November 2013
An Act to re-enact with amendments certain provisions of the Accident Compensation Act 1985 (Note: Accident Compensation Act 1985 (No. 10191)) and the Accident Compensation (WorkCover Insurance) Act 1993, (Note: Accident Compensation (WorkCover Insurance) Act 1993 (No. 50 of 1993)) to provide for the registration of employers and the payment of WorkCover premiums, to amend the Accident Compensation Act 1985, to repeal the Accident Compensation (WorkCover Insurance) Act 1993, to make consequential amendments to certain other Acts and for other purposes.
Courts and Other Justice Legislation Amendment Act 2013	No. 68 of 2013	
State Taxation and Financial Legislation Amendment Act 2013	No. 69 of 2013	
Statute Law Revision Act 2013 (repealed)	No. 70 of 2013	19 November 2013
An Act to revise the statute law of Victoria. (Repealed by Statute Law Revision Act 2013 (No. 70 of 2013)
Transport Accident Amendment Act 2013	No. 71 of 2013	
Crimes Amendment (Investigation Powers) Act 2013	No. 72 of 2013	
Emergency Management Act 2013	No. 73 of 2013	
Road Legislation Amendment Act 2013	No. 74 of 2013	
Disability Amendment Act 2013	No. 75 of 2013	
Education and Training Reform Amendment (Dual Sector Universities) Act 2013	No. 76 of 2013	
Justice Legislation Amendment (Miscellaneous) Act 2013	No. 77 of 2013	
Owners Corporations Amendment Act 2013	No. 78 of 2013	
Parks and Crown Land Legislation Amendment Act 2013	No. 79 of 2013	
Transport (Compliance and Miscellaneous) Amendment (On-the-Spot Penalty Fares) Act 2013	No. 80 of 2013	
Victoria Police Act 2013	No. 81 of 2013	17 December 2013
An Act to re-enact and modernise the law relating to the governance and regulation of Victoria Police, to retitle and substantially repeal the Police Regulation Act 1958 (Note: Police Regulation Act 1958 (No. 6338)) and for other purposes.

== Sources ==
- "Acts as made: 2013". Victoria Legislation.
