= Pauli Opas =

Finnish diplomat and ambassador

- Pauli Samuel Opas

Finnish Ambassador to Japan
- In office 1984–1985

Finnish Ambassador to the Czech Republic (Prague)
- In office 1993–1994

Personal details
- Born: October 30, 1929 Kurikka, Finland
- Profession: Diplomat

Pauli Samuel Opas (s. 30 October 1929 Kurikka) is a Finnish diplomat and Ambassador. He is a Bachelor of Political Science degree. He served as head of the Department for Trade Policy at the Ministry for Foreign Affairs 1979–1984 and Ambassador Tokyo 1984–1985 ja Prague 1993–1994
