= Philip Opas =

Australian barrister (1917–2008)

Philip Opas AM OBE QC
- Born: Philip Henry Napoleon Opas; 24 February 1917; Melbourne, Victoria, Australia
- Died: 25 August 2008 (aged 91); East Melbourne, Victoria, Australia
- Education: Melbourne Grammar School
- Alma mater: University of Melbourne
- Occupation: Barrister
- Spouse: Stella Sonenberg (m. 1939; died 2005)

Philip Henry Napoleon Opas AM OBE QC (24 February 1917 – 25 August 2008) was an Australian barrister. He was best known for his unsuccessful attempts to prevent the execution of Ronald Ryan, the last Australian person to be legally executed.

== Early life ==
Opas was born in Melbourne on 24 February 1917. He was the oldest of five children born to Sarah (née Goodman) and Joseph Henry Opas; his father was an accountant. He was of Portuguese-Jewish descent.

Opas grew up in the suburb of St Kilda, attending Melbourne Church of England Grammar School until the age of 15. He was subsequently apprenticed to Roy Schilling as a law clerk and went on to complete the degree of Bachelor of Laws at the University of Melbourne.

In 1939, Opas enlisted in the Royal Australian Air Force (RAAF). He served in New Guinea during World War II and retained an involvement with the military after the war's end, serving as judge advocate-general and reaching the rank of air commodore in the Air Force Reserve.

== Career ==
Opas was admitted to the Victorian Bar in 1942, while on leave from the RAAF. He read with Robert Monahan in 1946 and practised as a junior barrister until his appointment as Queen's Counsel in 1958. He had a wide-ranging practice that included criminal law, commercial law and local government matters. He retired from the bar in 1989.

=== Ronald Ryan ===
In 1966, Opas became the defence counsel to Ronald Ryan, who had been charged with murdering a prison warder while escaping from HM Prison Pentridge. Ryan was convicted of murder and in February 1967 became the last person to be legally executed in Australia. Opas was convinced of Ryan's innocence, believing it was impossible for him to have shot the warder at the angle at which he was shot. He attributed Ryan's execution to political interference from the Victorian premier Henry Bolte. The case reportedly "turned him from a supporter of capital punishment into a lifelong opponent".

Following Ryan's execution, Opas was charged with unprofessional conduct by the Ethics Committee of the Victorian Bar Council in connection with his public appeals for assistance with the case. He was prosecuted by Ninian Stephen but retained Richard McGarvie and Ivor Greenwood in his defence and had the charges dismissed. He was disillusioned by the experience and left the bar for four years to work as group legal officer for Conzinc Rio Tinto of Australia.

== Personal life and honours ==
In 1939, Opas married Stella Sonenberg, the daughter of a prominent criminal lawyer. The couple had two daughters, including Lynnette Schiftan who became one of Victoria's first female QCs and the first woman to sit on the County Court of Victoria. He was widowed in 2005 and died at Epworth Freemasons in East Melbourne on 25 August 2008, aged 91.

Opas bred racehorses at a property in Mathoura, New South Wales. In the 1970s he defended an owner accused of using ring-ins, subsequently writing a book titled The Great Ring-In.
