= Albury-Wodonga Development Corporation =

Former Australian government agency

Government agency overview
- Formed: 23 October 1973
- Dissolved: 31 December 2014
- Superseding Government agency: Department of Finance (Australia)
- Jurisdiction: Federal Government of Australia
- Headquarters: 8 King Edward Terace, Albury, New South Wales
- Employees: 3
- Government agency executive: Peter Veneris, Chief Executive Officer
- Key document: Albury–Wodonga Development Act 1974 (NSW); Albury–Wodonga Development Act 1973 (Vic); Albury–Wodonga Development Act 1973 (Cth)

The Albury-Wodonga Development Corporation was an agency of the Australian Government operating from 1972 until its abolition in 2014. It was created as part of the Whitlam government’s National Growth Centre project in an effort to decentralise the population, the corporation role was to manage and develop land with the aim to grow the Albury-Wodonga region to 300,000 people by the year 2000.

The corporation had a unique tripartite legal structure in that there existed three statutory corporations – one belonging to the Commonwealth (Albury-Wodonga Development Corporation), one belonging to Victoria (Albury-Wodonga (Victoria) Corporation) and one to New South Wales (Albury-Wodonga (New South Wales) Corporation). The three corporations were legally distinct, but in practice acted as a single entity.

== History ==
In 1972 the Whitlam Federal Labor government selected the cross-border towns of Albury (New South Wales) and Wodonga (Victoria) to form the Albury-Wodonga Growth Centre. The Albury-Wodonga Corporation, a Commonwealth statutory authority, was established by the Albury-Wodonga Development Act 1973 (Cth).

The role of the corporation was originally as a land developer within the Albury-Wodonga region. The National Growth Centre project officially ended in 1995, but the corporation continued to function. However, in 2004 the corporation ceased development activities at which time it owned 6,500 hectares. It then became the corporation's responsibility to dispose of property assets and provide a financial return to the government in preparation for its abolition.

It was decided in 1995 to wind up the corporation. It was agreed in February 1997 that the wind-up would be phased, with the state corporations to be abolished first (their assets passing to the federal corporation upon abolition), with the federal corporation to be abolished subsequently. The NSW state corporation was abolished on 26 September 2003 as provided for by the Albury-Wodonga Development Repeal Act 2000 (No. 18, 2000 (NSW)). The abolition of the Victorian state corporation was effected by the Albury-Wodonga Agreement (Repeal) Act 2003 (No. 62 of 2003 (Vic)).

In July 2014, the Albury-Wodonga Development Corporation (Abolition) Act 2014 (Cth) was passed by the Commonwealth parliament and the wind up of the federal corporation began. By the end of 2014 the federal corporation had been wound up and the remaining assets transferred to the Department of Finance.
