= Crimes Act 1958 =

Victorian legislation

Parliament of Victoria
- Long title: An Act to consolidate the Law Relating to Crimes and Criminal Offenders
- Citation: No. 6231 of 1958
- Status: Current legislation

The Crimes Act 1958 (No. 6231) is an act of the Parliament of Victoria.

The act codified most common law crimes in the jurisdiction. Most crimes in this act are indictable offences, whereas the Summary Offences Act 1966 covers summary offences. Indictable offenses are those which carry a penalty of more than two years imprisonment, and have a right to be heard in front of a jury, in the County or Supreme Court of Victoria. Indictable offenses can still be heard summarily, that is, in front of a single magistrate in the Magistrates' Court of Victoria.
