= Dandenong Hub =

Shopping centre and office building

Dandenong Hub Arcade
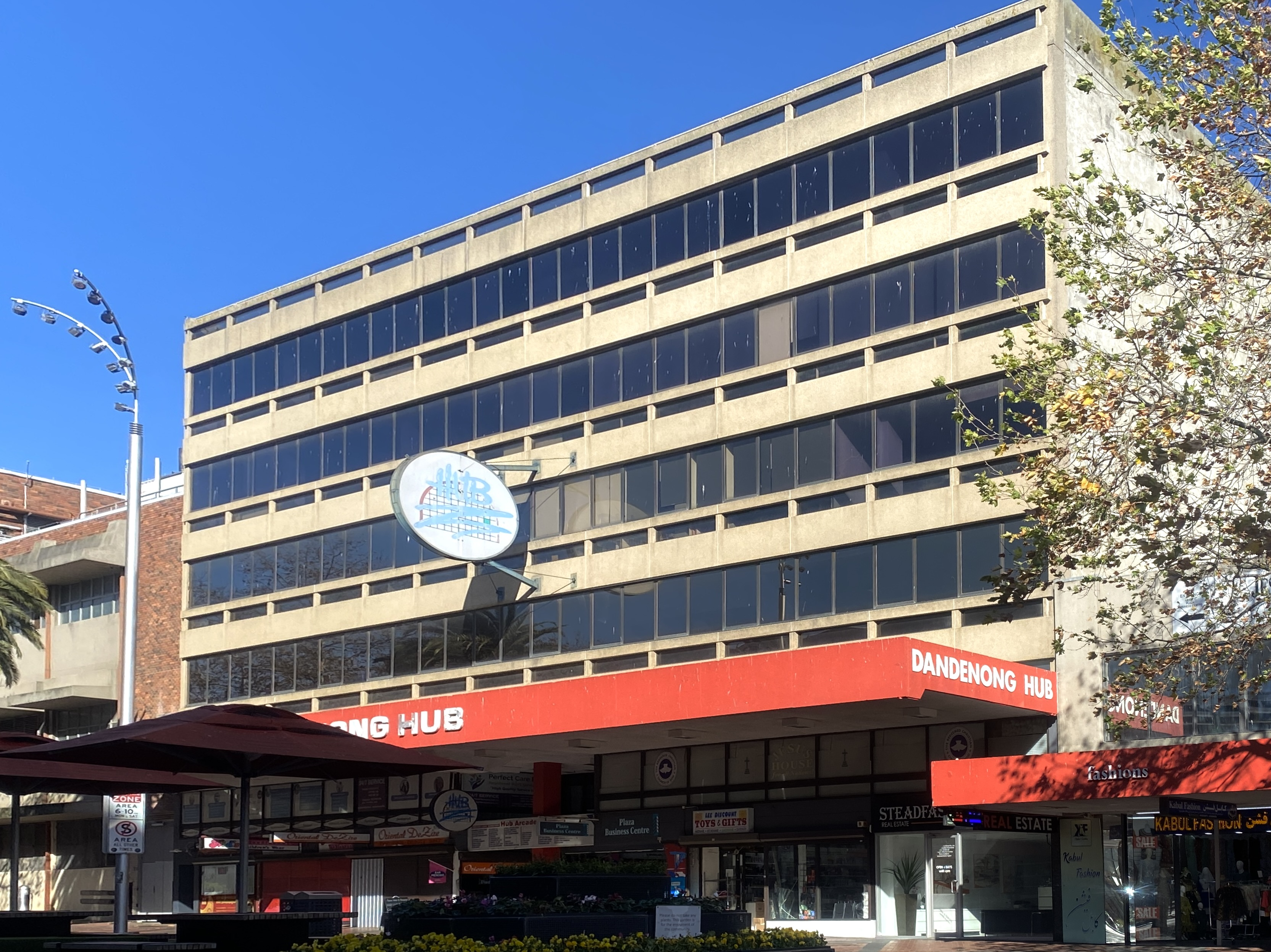
- Address: 15-23 Langhorne Street, Dandenong
- Opened: 27 November 1974
- Developer: Hanover Holdings
- Owner: Strata title
- Architect: Bill Millar; Ray Barnard Brown
- Num. of stores: 40
- Floor area: 3,148m2
- Floors: 2 (shopping centre); 6 (including offices)

The Dandenong Hub Arcade is a small shopping centre and former office building in the Melbourne suburb of Dandenong, Australia. Situated between Langhorne Street and Dandenong Square, it has a small selection of specialty stores and independent grocers. It opened in 1974 and remains among the few unaltered commercial buildings in the area. The proximity of competing centres and complicated management have contributed to a decline in patronage especially in recent years.

== History ==
=== Development ===
The Dandenong Hub Arcade was built by Hanover Holdings, a public property group jointly controlled by developers Maurice Alter, George Herscu and Paul Fayman. Hanover had been a familiar face in the Dandenong community through the 1970s, as the area hosted many of the company's developments like Dandenong Arcade, Hanover Arcade, the Gala Theatre and the Dandenong Bowl-O-Matic.

Designed in the late modernist style, the Hub was developed at a cost of around A$7 million and incorporates two retail floors of 43 shops, a food court and 2760 square metres of office space across 4 upper levels. The original architects were Bill Millar and Ray Barnard-Brown, who also designed Hanover's Vermont South Shopping Centre and Centrepoint Mall.

=== Opening ===
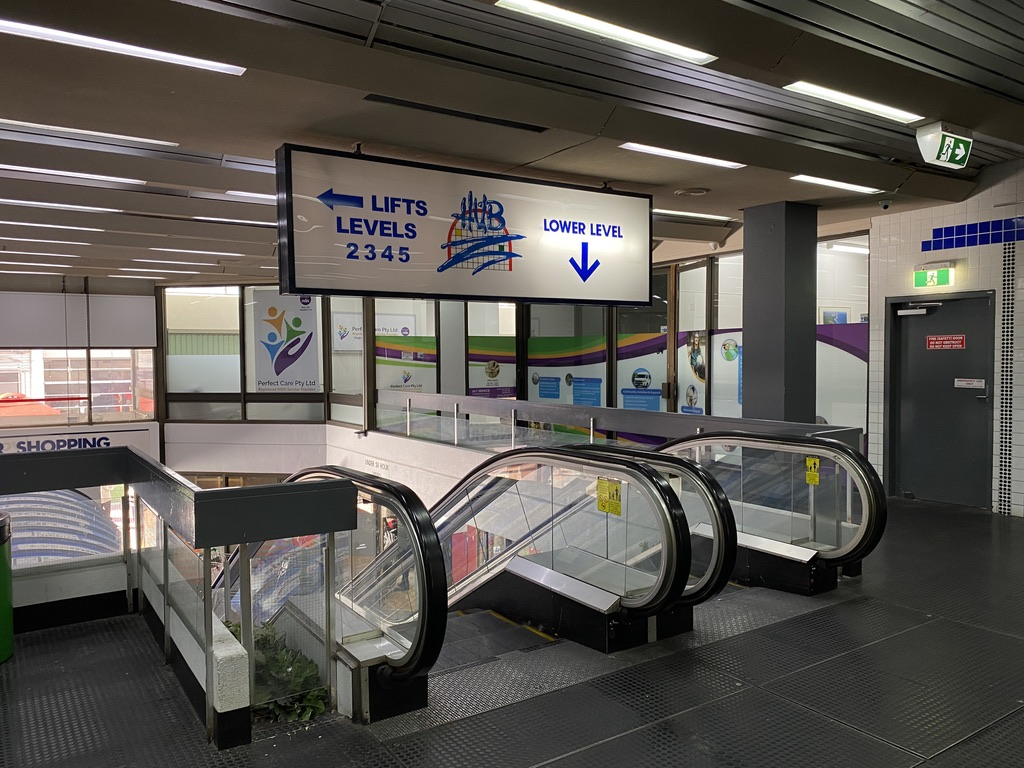
Interior of Dandenong Hub, 2025

Dandenong Hub was officially opened on 27 November 1974 by Public Works Minister Roberts Dunstan, who revealed a commemorative plaque. The grand opening featured live music from a jazz band and special appearances by television personalities Sue Donovan, Philip Brady, and Jimmy Hannan, who entertained the crowd and signed autographs for the thousands of shoppers in attendance.

Some 10,000 complimentary tickets to Village drive-in theatres were distributed during the opening week. From the outset, the arcade's two retail floors attracted prominent tenants including Walsh's, Brashs, Yamaha Music Centre, Portmans, Tresurway, PB Shoes, Roger David, and A. E. Moore & Sons.

=== Decline ===
Hanover sold it to the Local Authorities Superannuation Board for $9.2m in the late 1970s amid the dissolution of the Alter-Herscu-Fayman partnership.

Although initially popular, patronage of Dandenong Hub began a long and drawn-out decline in 1989, when the adjacent Myer department store was converted into a rival indoor shopping centre (today known as Dandenong Plaza). The Hub is currently owned by several entities through a strata title, which limits and complicates refurbishment and major works.

The food court did not recover after the COVID lockdowns in 2020–21 and has sat vacant since. In July 2025, the Greater Dandenong Leader revealed that an encampment of 30 rough sleepers had taken over the building's fire stairwells and unoccupied office space. They also shed light on recent reports of gang violence, blatant drug dealing and brazen or elaborate robberies that have been on the rise.
