= Ball & Welch =

Department store in Melbourne, Australia

Ball & Welch Pty Ltd
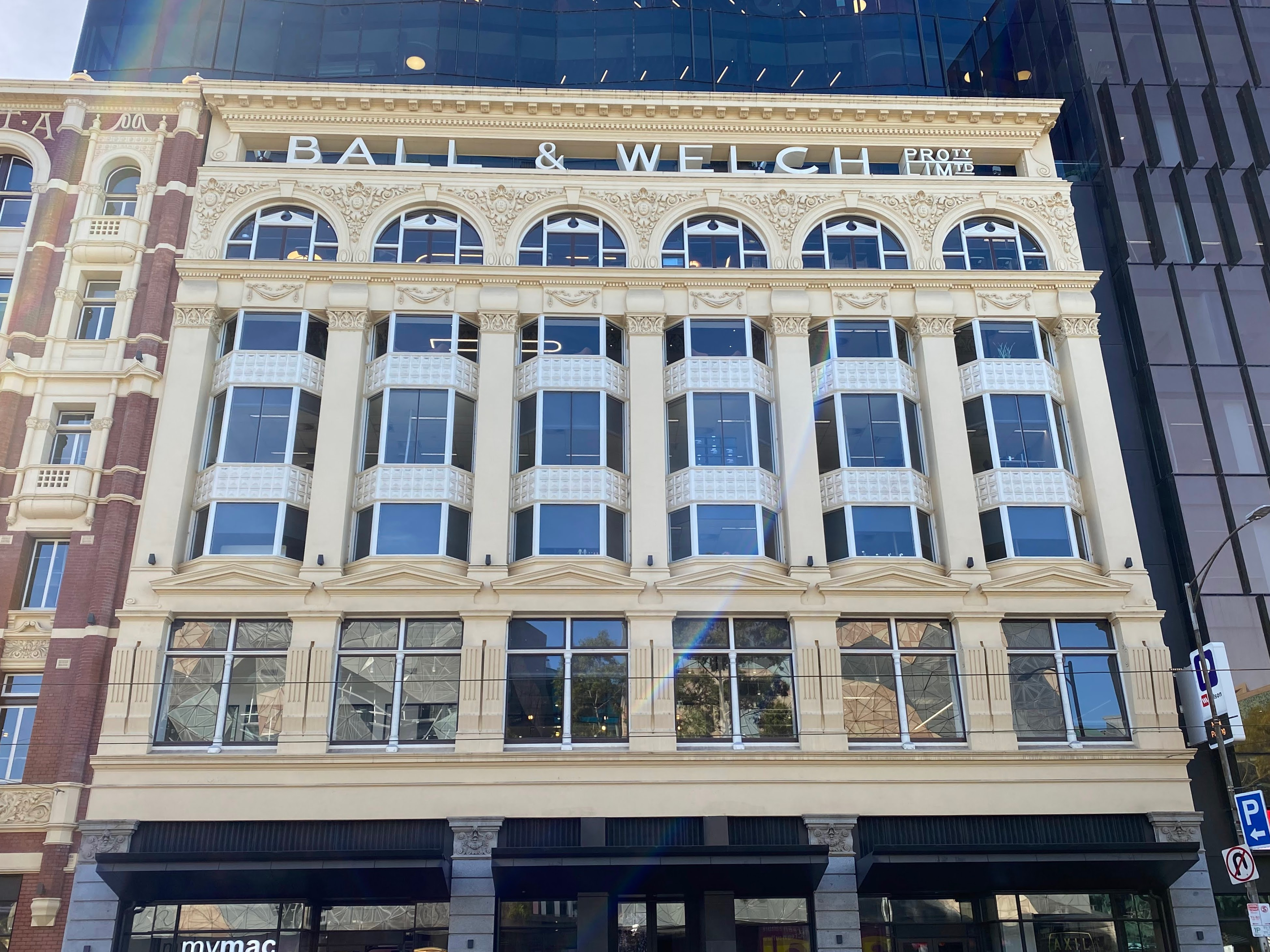
- Ball & Welch store at Flinders Street, Melbourne
- Industry: Retail
- Founded: 1855
- Founders: Charles Ball; William Henry Welch
- Defunct: 1976; 50 years ago
- Area served: Victoria, Australia
- Parent: Georges

Ball & Welch Pty Ltd was a prominent department store in Melbourne, Australia from the 19th century through to the 1970s. In its heyday, the Ball & Welch department store was Melbourne's leading family draper, its A to Z departments including gloves, umbrellas and handkerchiefs, mantles, furniture, mercery, millinery, furs and corsets. At one time 26 assistants were devoted to the sale of lace alone.

== History ==
This drapery business was founded by Charles Ball (born 14 February 1813 Frome, Somerset, England - 2 September 1876 Melbourne, Australia) and his nephew, William Henry Welch (born:c. 1833 and died:2 January 1896) in 1855. The company's first permanent store opened on the Goldfields at Forest Creek, at Vaughan Springs in 1861. In 1882, it moved to nearby Castlemaine.

In 1874 a branch was established in Melbourne in the suburb of Carlton. The large three-storied premises had frontages to Faraday, Drummond and University streets. The Carlton premises were subsequently used as a warehouse, the original building there partly was destroyed by fire in 1928.

An emporium at 180 Flinders Street was designed by architects Reed Smart & Tappin and was completed in 1899 in an American Romanesque style. The store was extended in 1911 with the purchase of the adjoining Commercial Travellers' Club. The store occupied around one third of the total block and stretched between Flinders Street and Flinders Lane. The Flinders Street store was one of the first in Melbourne to erect neon outdoor advertising, reportedly visible from the Dandenong Ranges. A Sydney branch operated between 1913 and 1924.

In the midst of the Great Depression Ball & Welch contributed to the raising of funds used in 1931 to build a public art gallery in Castlemaine, before the Castlemaine store closed in 1941.

Ball and Welch was listed on the Stock Exchange in 1935. The company was profitable for most of its history. In 1955, the company celebrated 100 years of trading with a commemorative booklet distributed through the Melbourne Herald on 19 March 1955.

In 1962 the company expanded and established a store in Frankston followed by Camberwell, and at Eastland (1966) and Southland (1968) shopping centres. It also operated a 'Ball & Welch gift store' at the then Melbourne Airport landside terminal in Essendon.

== Demise ==
In January 1970, Georges launched a successful takeover bid of Ball & Welch in a deal valued at $A1.48 million dollars. The directors of Georges believed that Ball & Welch stores would give Georges a foothold in the suburbs. Instead, Georges closed all of the Ball & Welch stores by 1976, selling the flagship Flinders Street store in May 1976 to an affiliate company of Hanover Holdings for just over $3 million.

== Flinders Street store ==
Ball & Welch's former Flinders Street store was redeveloped during the late 1970s under the direction of prominent property developers Maurice Alter and George Herscu – officially reopening on 31 July 1978 as the Flinders Fair shopping centre. Flinders Fair comprised approximately 150 retail outlets together with an international food hall and a third-level plaza incorporating a public entertainment area. The redevelopment provided around 50,000 square feet of retail floor space, arranged in a marketplace-style layout that sought to combine contemporary retail practices with references to the traditional public bazaar model.

The redevelopment was reported to have cost more than $7 million. A notable feature of the centre’s operation was the encouragement of price negotiation, with a significant proportion of retailers owning their individual shop premises. Leon Johnson, developer of the Preston Market, acted as a consultant on the project. The architectural design was undertaken by Bill Millar and Ray Barnard-Brown. Free entertainment was a key feature of Flinders Fair during its initial few years of success, with events such as discos and reptile-handling displays held on the third level. Entertainer Molly Meldrum, then at the height of his success with popular music show Countdown, compered an entertainment programme at Flinders Fair in 1978.

The development of Flinders Fair occurred during a period when Melbourne developers were increasingly focused on adapting and reusing existing structures rather than demolishing them. This shift toward “recycling” buildings was driven by a growing heritage advocacy movement and the practical advantage of lowering construction costs. A comparable example is the former Centrepoint Mall on Bourke Street, which involved the same architects and developers as Flinders Fair and reflected the same adaptive reuse philosophy emerging in the city at the time.

Ultimately, however, the developers were unable to secure enough tenants and the project failed. After touring Flinders Fair in 1980, actor Warwick Randall reported “shuttered shopfronts” and “empty echoing corridors,” though he praised its variety of cuisines, describing the food as “good, and cheap.” Melbourne's retail heart had long since moved further north, and Flinders Street had become a defunct shopping precinct. Furthermore, during the early 1980s, the centre's owners faced wide-spread scrutiny for billing a corrupt gift to trade unionist Norm Gallagher under the guise of a plumbing contract for the centre. Developers Maurice Alter and George Herscu were subsequently charged and pleaded guilty, but did not serve jail time.

Coinciding with the negative publicity, there was an attempt to sell the complex to the privately-owned Burlock group – who proposed a controversial A$85 million redevelopment of the site into a office project known as Cathedral Square. However, owing to preservation advocacy bought on by the National Trust, the historic building and the neighbouring former Chelsea Cinema were spared from demolition. By 1982, Flinders Fair was virtually empty with the exception of a bingo hall and newsagency. In October 1984, the site was purchased by financier Don Figgins for A$6.5 million – which was less than the amount invested into the Flinders Fair redevelopment just six years earlier.

Subsequently, the building was converted into a parking garage and office development known as Flindersgate – completed in 1990. The historic facade was retained and refreshed. A project spokesperson claimed that "Unlike most of the car parks that have gone up in Melbourne in the past, this won't be an eyesore". Following the 1996 announcement of Federation Square and a subsequent renewed interest in the Flinders Street precinct, a plan was put forward to develop over 50 new apartments atop the building.

Eventually, a redevelopment in 2020 saw the facades restored close to their appearance in c1900, and the top levels of car park replaced by office space, with two extra floors, setback from the facades. The office were occupied by Hub Australia coworking space, as well as offices for the builders, John Holland. The honour roll from the Flinders Street store which commemorated the employees who served in World War One was relocated to the Light Horse & Field Artillery Museum at Nar Nar Goon, Victoria.

=== Frankston store ===
The Frankston store, somewhat altered, became a Savers Store, then in 2020 a General Public entertainment venue.
