= Charles Zuker (businessman) =

Australian businessman and criminal (1928–1983)

- Zuker in 1964
- Born: 1928
- Died: 1983 (aged 54–55)
- Occupation: Businessman
- Board member of: Newport Freezing Works (1965-71)
- Criminal charge: Counterfeiting currency
- Penalty: 10 years in prison

Details
- Span of crimes: 1974–1975
- Location: Abbotsford, Victoria

Charles Zuker (1928–1983) was an Australian businessman and philanthropist who was convicted in 1975 for financing an international counterfeit money operation.

== Life and career ==
He was born in Poland in 1928 to an orthodox Jewish family, who fled persecution to live in Melbourne when he was around 3 years old. His father, Israel Sukiert, built up the Record Leather Company, which supplied jobs to citizens of Melbourne's inner north during the Great Depression. It operated within a broader enterprise associated with the Preston Meat Works.

His family was highly respected by their local community. Zuker's father was a key instigator in the evolution of the Bialystock Centre, a way-station for Jewish refugees after the war, and helped to establish Bialik College.

In 1965, he partnered with the Masaga Group to buy the Newport Freezing Works. The facility employed a staff of over 900 by 1969 and was expected to export about $20m worth of meat that year. He also co-owned the former Clare Castle hotel site on Elizabeth Street with Maurice Alter and George Herscu. In 1970, he sold his share in the venture to Paul Fayman.

== Counterfeiting operation ==
In early 1975, Victoria Police uncovered evidence of an elaborate counterfeiting operation targeting U.S. currency. Investigators found specialised printing plates and high-quality forgery equipment at premises linked to the suspects. The conspirators allegedly produced forged U.S. $20 and $100 notes with “unusually good quality” engraving. The face value of notes seized and attributed to the scheme totalled about US$12 million. Zuker emerged as the organiser and financier of the scheme.

Zuker’s group prepared falsified documentation and planned to move the counterfeit notes through international contacts. Police suspected the forgeries were destined for use in Asia and Europe. Zuker was presented as the ringleader of the forgery ring. He financed the operation and arranged contacts in Bangkok and Singapore. Two other men, a press operator and a currency dealer, were cited as co-conspirators.

Police alleged one associate ran the offset printing equipment, while another procured printing plates and paper. In court, Zuker denied any knowledge of the forging machinery, claiming he had been set up. However, evidence included ledgers and intercepted correspondence linking him to the scheme. In contrast, at least one co-accused admitted guilt. A printing press worker pleaded guilty to processing the fake notes, and agreed to testify against Zuker in exchange for a lighter sentence. Police believed the conspirators had created nearly all denominations of U.S. bills.

On 29 April 1975, Zuker and three others were formally charged in the County Court at Melbourne. Police presented an affidavit citing filmed evidence of printing presses and intercepted telegrams. Zuker pleaded not guilty in early June, arguing there was no direct proof he printed the notes. One co-accused (the press operator) gave sworn evidence on 4 June claiming he believed the printing was only for “propaganda purposes”, an unlikely defence according to police. The trial lasted a few weeks, during which the Crown showed photographs of printing plates and samples of forged notes.

Zuker received the heaviest penalty. According to the newspaper report, the judge remarked that the offences were “planned with high criminal expertise” and had “the potential to flood international markets” with fake currency. Zuker was sentenced to 10 years’ imprisonment. His three associates each received 5–8 years, depending on their level of cooperation. All defendants were also fined.

After sentencing, the media noted no appeal had been filed immediately. Zuker’s defense lawyer commented that his client’s role was overstated by police, and that he had only intended a legitimate business venture. Authorities responded that the sentence reflected the unprecedented nature of the crime. The forged notes were destroyed under police supervision following the trial.

The scandal remained a notable case in Australian law enforcement history. Zuker’s name appeared in law-enforcement bulletins thereafter as a cautionary example.
