= Slonim, Velik & Emanuel =

Australian law firm (1949–1979)

- Formerly: Slonim & Velik
- Type: Private
- Industry: Finance; Law
- Founded: 1949 in Melbourne, Australia
- Founder: Maurice Slonim; Leon Velik
- Defunct: 1979
- Successor: Slonim, Velik & Sauberni
- Key people: Maurice Slonim (until 1969); Leon Velik; Graeme Emanuel (from 1969)

Slonim, Velik & Emanuel was a private law firm based in Melbourne, Australia.

The partners were also principal directors of the private Development Consolidated consortium.

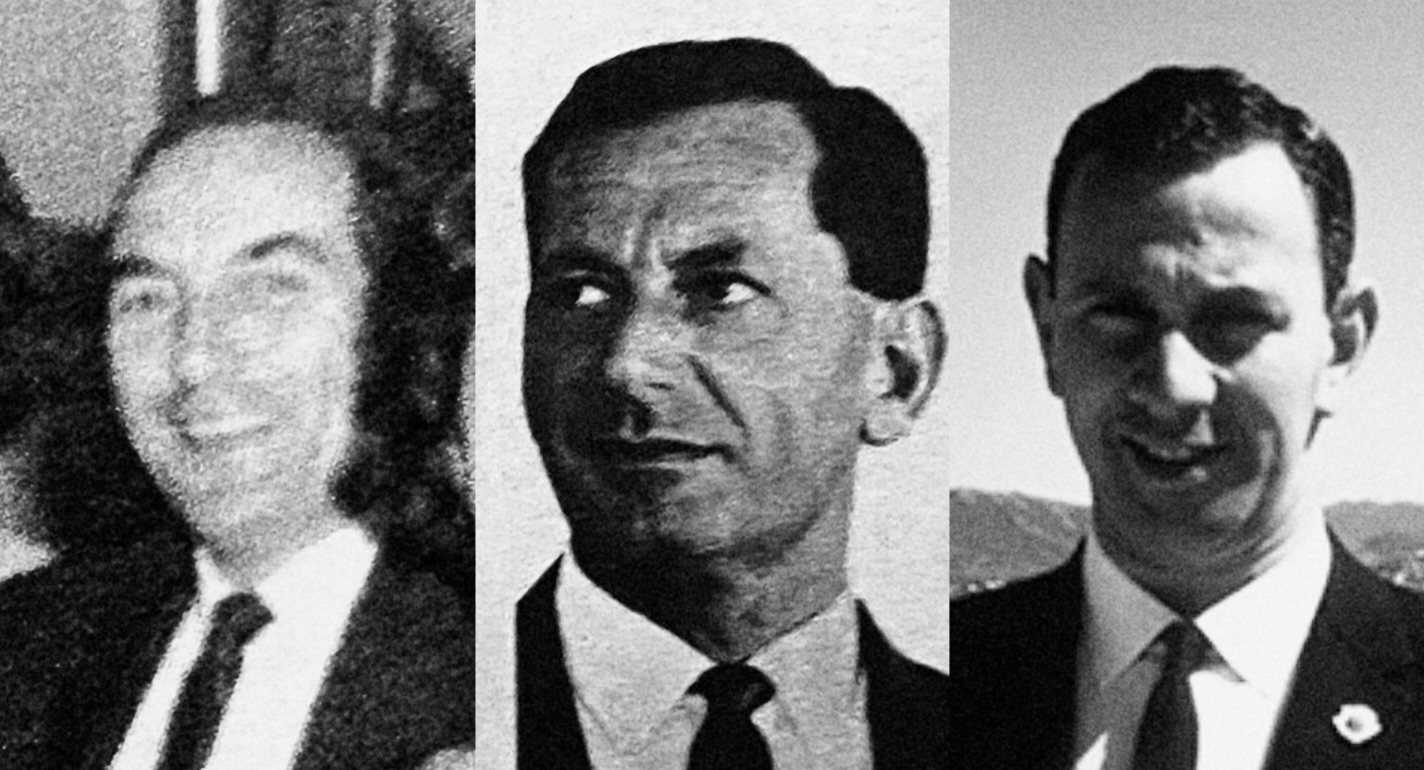
L-R: M. Slonim, L. Velik, G. Emanuel

== Early years ==
The firm was established as a partnership between lawyers Leon Velik and Maurice Slonim. Both studied law at the University of Melbourne and served in the same training unit during the Second World War.

According to Velik, the two agreed during the war that, if they both survived, they would establish a law firm together. Several years after the war ended, Slonim contacted Velik to remind him of the agreement. Although Velik had recently become a junior partner at a Collins Street law firm, he honoured the commitment, resigned from his position, and joined Slonim in founding the partnership.

Slonim & Velik was established in 1949 and initially operated from a ground-floor office on Lygon Street in Carlton. Located in the centre of Melbourne's Jewish community, the firm provided a range of commercial legal services, including lease and partnership agreements. Many of its early clients were Holocaust survivors who had emigrated and established small businesses, such as grocery stores and milk bars.

The firm's early growth was aided by Maurice Slonim's father, Judah Slonim, a founder of the Elwood Shule and a prominent member of Melbourne's Jewish community and had extensive connections. One of the firm's early clients was Luigi Grollo, a concreter who was building small homes in Northcote before his family business grew to become Grocon.

== Expansion ==
In March 1958, the firm relocated to the Lombard Building. Around this time, it began partnering with private property developers, most notably the Masaga Group. Much of this work was undertaken through the firm's financial services arm, S & V Investments, which managed investment funds on behalf of clients and invested them in a range of assets, including mortgage lending. Leon Velik's brother-in-law, Graeme Emanuel, was briefly admitted as a partner during the late 1960s, and the firm adopted the name Slonim, Velik & Emanuel.

In early 1969, the firm assisted stockbroker Reid & Co with the Masaga Group's reverse takeover of Allans Finance, which was restructured to become Hanover Holdings.

== Notable cases ==
=== Sharpe v Young ===
In 1954, Norman Sharpe, trading as Norman's Corner Stores, sought possession of the neighbouring Singapore Cafe at 163–165 Russell Street, Melbourne, which was leased to Allen Young. Sharpe wished to use the premises to expand his business, while Young sought to retain part of the cafe to continue trading. Represented by solicitors Slonim & Velik, Sharpe pursued the matter through the Supreme Court of Victoria after a magistrate initially dismissed their application, believing they could not divide the premises between the parties. The Supreme Court ruled that such an arrangement was permissible, allowing Sharpe to take possession of the first floor and part of the ground floor while Young retained the remainder. In a subsequent hearing, the court upheld conditions requiring Sharpe to install partitions and lavatories to enable Young to continue operating his business.

=== Frieze v Unger ===
Between 1959 and 1960, Slonim & Velik represented Salomon Unger in a Supreme Court of Victoria property dispute concerning a house in the Melbourne suburbHawthorn. Unger, a Polish migrant, had occupied the property with his wife and young son since August 1952 under an agreement with co-owner Jacob Frieze, whereby the family provided meals and laundry services in return for accommodation and weekly payments. Following Jacob's death in November 1957, his surviving brother Henry sought to recover possession of the property, while Unger claimed the right to remain.

Slonim & Velik argued that the arrangement constituted a tenancy rather than a licence, or that a tenancy had subsequently arisen through the conduct of the parties. They also maintained that the Landlord and Tenant Act 1953 afforded the Ungers statutory protection against eviction. In a judgment delivered in July 1959, Justice Reginald Sholl rejected these arguments, finding that the arrangement was a licence and that the Ungers were bona fide lodgers, exempt from the statutory provisions governing the conversion of certain licences into leases. Judgment was therefore entered for Frieze, with an order for possession, mesne profits and costs. The case also examined the effect of leases granted by one joint tenant on the interests of a surviving co-owner. Although these observations were not essential to the outcome, Frieze v Unger was subsequently discussed in Australian law reform publications and academic literature concerning the temporary suspension or severance of joint tenancies.

=== Fashion Craft Garment Co v Adler, Mutual Trade Credits P/L ===
In 1959, Slonim & Velik acted for Fashion Craft Garment Co in a Supreme Court of Victoria dispute concerning a bill of sale over furniture seized to satisfy a debt of £2,999 owed by several defendants. Mutual Trade Credits Pty Ltd claimed ownership of the furniture under the bill of sale, but Slonim & Velik challenged its validity, arguing that it failed to comply with the Money Lenders Act 1958 and the Instruments Act 1958. The principal issue concerned the occupations of two of the defendants, Mrs Mary Kopel and Mrs Adler, which were incorrectly recorded as "home duties" despite both undertaking paid work in the knitting industry.

In October 1959, Justice Frank Gavan Duffy found that the bill contravened section 35(2) of the Instruments Act, which required the occupations of grantors to be disclosed. Citing the English decision Barron v Potter, Duffy held that occupation referred to the trade or employment by which a person ordinarily earned a living, and that the incorrect descriptions rendered the bill of sale inoperative and without legal or equitable effect. He also declined to excuse the defect, finding insufficient evidence to justify doing so. A separate argument concerning guarantees provided by the defendants' husbands was rejected. Judgment was entered for Fashion Craft Garment Co, with Mutual Trade Credits ordered to pay its costs. The decision clarified the statutory requirements for bills of sale, particularly the obligation to disclose grantors' actual occupations rather than merely describing them as undertaking domestic duties.

=== Klvac v Weisbrem ===
In 1959, Slonim & Velik acted as solicitors for the defendants in a Supreme Court of Victoria dispute concerning the validity of a notice to quit issued under the Landlord and Tenant Act 1958. The landlords sought to recover possession of the defendants' premises on the grounds that their financial circumstances allowed them to purchase or lease alternative accommodation without undue hardship. Slonim & Velik challenged the notice, arguing that it failed to specify the prescribed statutory ground and provide adequate particulars. In a judgment delivered in November 1959, Justice Frank Gavan Duffy found that the wording of the notice differed materially from the statutory provision, which required the landlords to establish that the tenants could obtain alternative accommodation without undue financial hardship. He further held that a list of available properties supplied by the landlords' estate agents could not remedy the omission. Finding that the notice was ineffective and that the landlords had not been specifically permitted to rely on an alternative ground, he made the order nisi absolute, set aside the earlier order of the court of petty sessions and dismissed the landlords' application for possession. The decision reinforced the requirement that notices to quit under the legislation accurately specify the prescribed grounds relied upon by landlords.

=== Frank v Grosvenor Motor Auctions P/L ===
In 1960, Slonim & Velik acted for the complainant in a Supreme Court of Victoria dispute arising from the purchase of a second-hand Renault Dauphine for £580. The complainant alleged that the car had been misrepresented as a 1958 model and was defective, with a fractured gearbox and differential, despite assurances from the auctioneers that it was in good condition apart from a faulty clutch. After the court of petty sessions dismissed the complaint, Slonim & Velik challenged the decision, arguing that the sale was subject to implied conditions under the Goods Act 1958 concerning merchantable quality and fitness for purpose. In a judgment delivered in March 1960, Justice George Pape found that the magistrate had misapplied the statutory provisions, particularly in concluding that the buyer's examination of the vehicle necessarily excluded the implied condition of merchantable quality. He clarified that the exclusion applied only to defects which a buyer's actual examination ought reasonably to have revealed, and that a sale could still be one by description even where the buyer had inspected the goods. He also considered the circumstances in which a buyer's reliance on a seller's skill and judgment could be implied, and held that the ordinary purpose of purchasing a motor car was to use it as a road vehicle, rather than simply to resell it at a profit. Although he rejected several grounds of appeal, Pape J made the order nisi absolute, setting aside the magistrate's decision and directing that the outstanding issues concerning the vehicle's condition, its fitness for purpose and the alleged contractual warranties be reheard. The judgment provided guidance on the application of the aforementioned Goods Act to second-hand vehicle sales, particularly the requirements for merchantable quality and fitness for purpose.

== Dissolution ==
Maurice Slonim died from a brain tumour in August 1969. Under the Slonim, Velik & Emanuel partnership agreement, the surviving partners were entitled to acquire the share of a deceased partner. Due to Slonim's death and Emanuel's subsequent departure to the United States, Velik became the firm's sole managing partner and retained a majority interest in the business, assuming responsibility for its management, staff, and client practice.
