= Vermont South Shopping Centre =

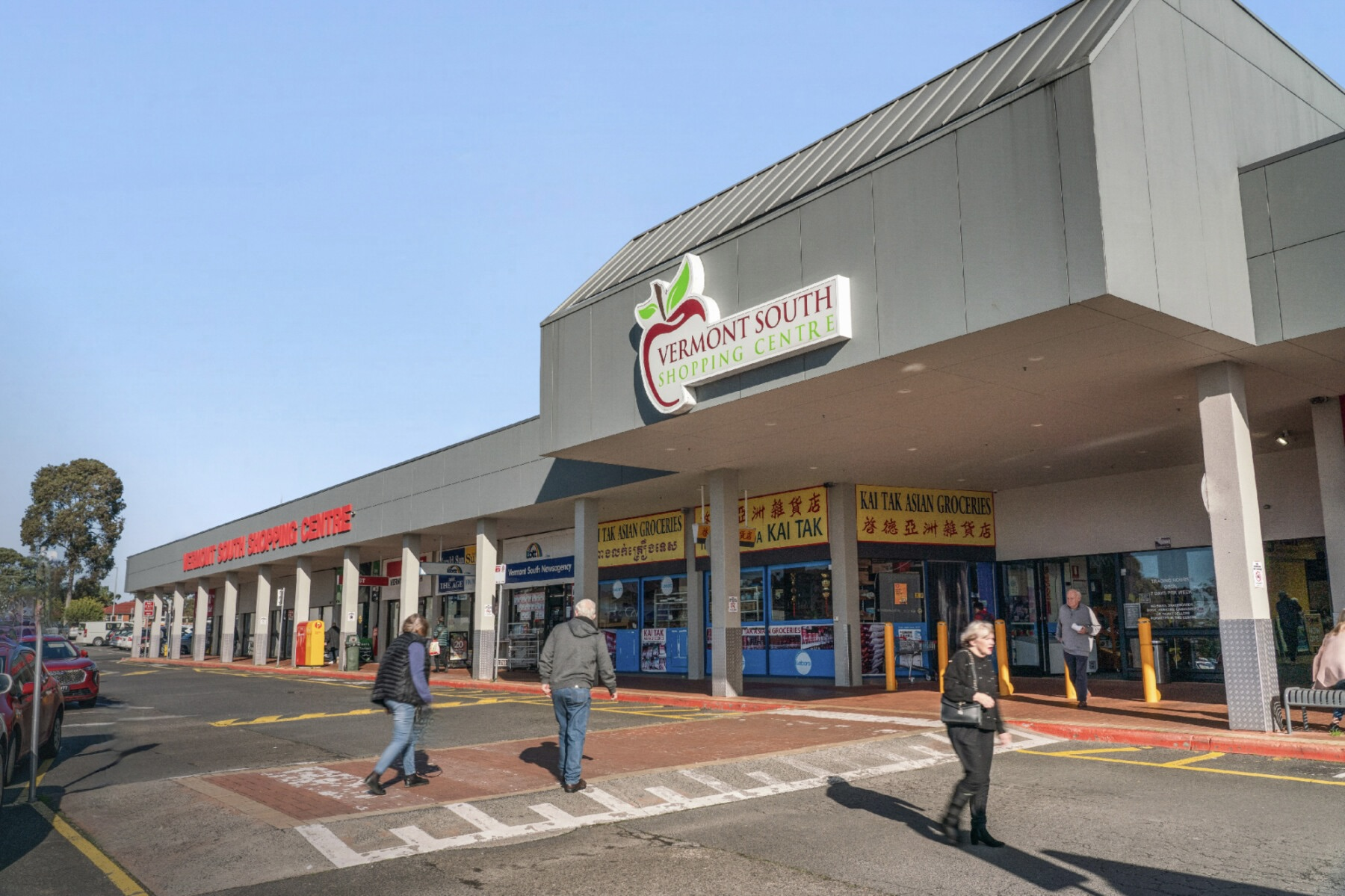
- Location: Vermont South, Victoria, Australia
- Coordinates: 37.85504°S 145.18260°E
- Address: 495-511 Burwood Highway
- Opened: 22 October 1974
- Developer: Hanover Holdings
- Manager: Strata Prime
- Architect: Ray Barnard-Brown (1973–75); Meldrum, Burrows & Pts (1984)
- Num. of stores: 50+
- Num. of anchor tenants: 2
- Floor area: 11,500m2
- Floors: 1
- Parking: 650+

The Vermont South Shopping Centre is an indoor and outdoor retail complex located in the Melbourne suburb of Vermont South, Australia. Anchored by supermarket chains Aldi Süd and Coles, it has about 50 specialty stores and parking for about 650 cars. The centre opened in 1974 and was developed by Hanover Holdings.

== History ==
The centre was developed by Hanover Holdings, a private developer best remembered for opening the Forest Hills Shopping Centre at the edge of suburban Melbourne in 1964. As suburban sprawl creeped closer towards Vermont South, Hanover executives Paul Fayman, Maurice Alter and George Herscu undertook a land-buying spree – speculatively acquiring over 150 hectares of orchards with the intention of turning them into vast housing estates.

At the height of the housing boom, in mid-1973, Hanover announced plans to build a regional shopping complex at Vermont South alongside an additional 260 houses along Burwood Highway. Architect Ray Barnard-Brown planned the centre, which comprised a rectangular retail block with large anchor stores on either end, which were initially tenanted by branches of the Venture department store and Coles New World supermarket chains.

These were separated by an indoor mall of about 45 specialty stores and some shops on the front and rear service roads. A separate restaurant and a Mobil service station were developed concurrently. Skylight manufacturer Atlas was contracted to build unique, timber-boarded light shafts which remain a key architectural feature alongside occasional remnant brown brick, linoleum, and terrazzo details.

The centre's indoor mall section retains its original popcorn ceilings. The development created Hanover Road, Kiama Close, Woodleigh Crescent, Pelham Drive, Myriong Avenue and Wilpena Place.

=== Opening ===
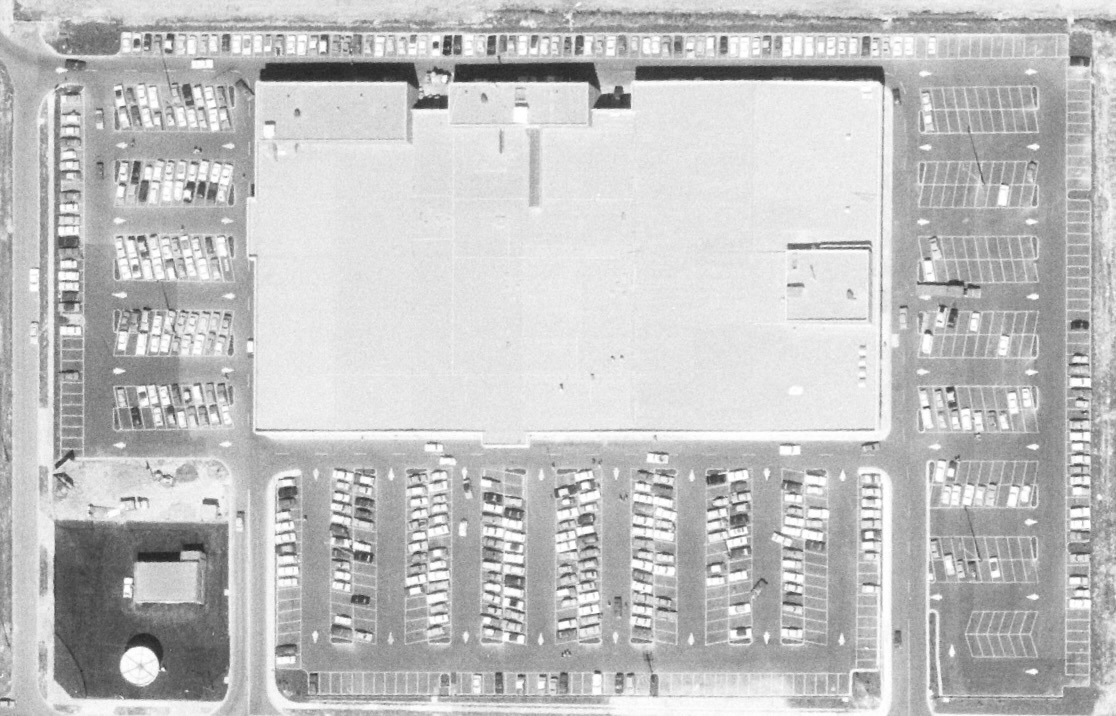
Aerial view, 1975

The Vermont South Shopping Centre was officially opened on 22 October 1974 by Joe Rafferty, who was the Victorian Minister for Labour And Industry and Minister for Consumer Affairs at the time.

=== Alterations and ownership changes ===
The property was retained by Maurice Alter's Pacific Group after Hanover split in the late 1970s, and was acquired by Westpac in the 1980s. For the last few decades, the shopping centre has been owned by several entities through strata titles. In 1984, Alter commissioned architects Meldrum, Burrows & Partners to design visual and functional improvements.

A new fascia design was implemented, the former Venture tenancy was divided to accommodate new tenants, and a total of seven new shops were established. The site was listed for sale again in April 1986. The canopy above the centre's south entrance was extended in 1990 as part of a signage upgrade, however, this was later reverted as it was frequently struck by trucks on the service road. In 2013, supermarket chain Aldi acquired and renovated a large portion of the former department store tenancy –adding windows, a new loading dock, and modernised fittings.

A highly anticipated overhaul commenced in 2021 which included an internal and external repaint, removal of the carpet and replacement of the dilapidated facia/canopies. Shortly after renovations were completed, $10 million was invested into upgrading the 4216m^{2} Coles supermarket, which received a new deli, bakery, fresh food section and upgraded click-and-collect facilities – opened by Micheal Sukkar MP in late August 2022.

== Surrounding developments ==
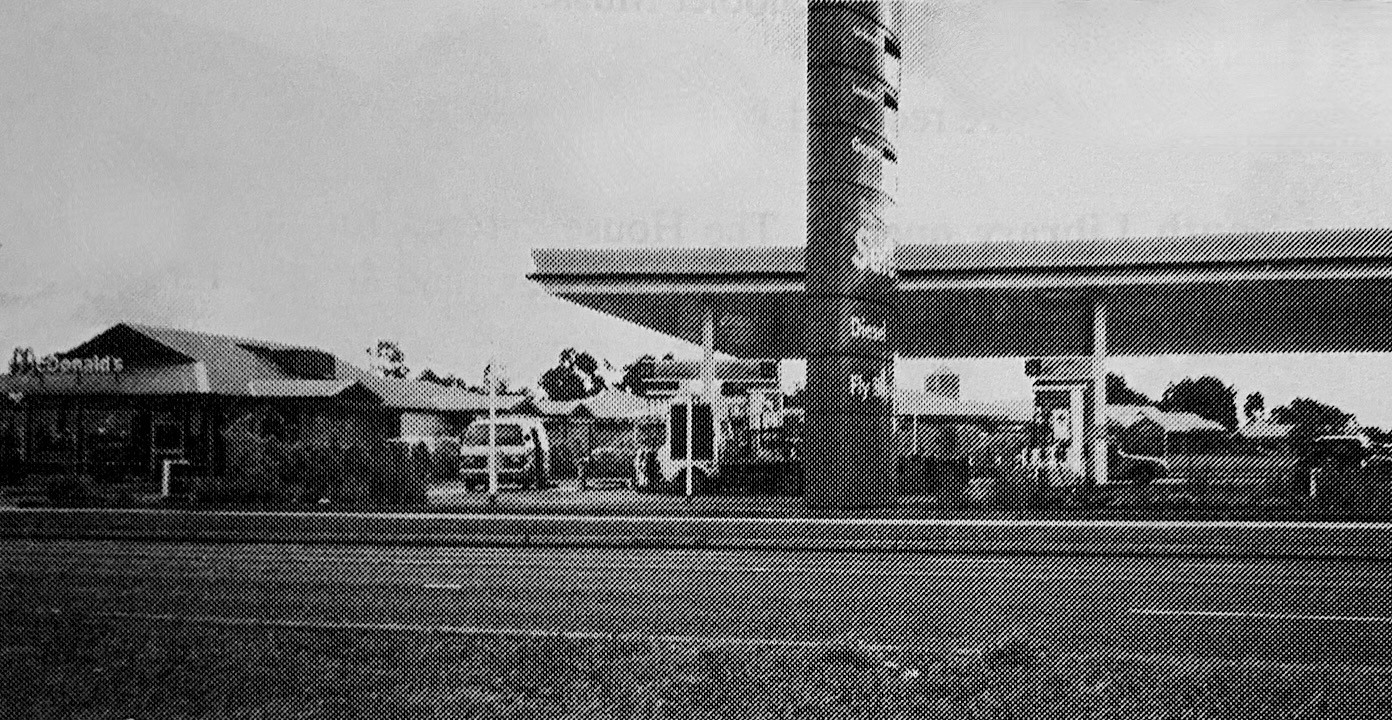
McDonalds and Shell, 1996

The free-standing Prince of China take-away restaurant opened directly south of the centre c. 1975–76. The building was extended to accommodate a dining hall and became Bo On in mid-1987. The restaurant would later re-open as Han Palace in 2005 and as Crown Palace in 2006. In 2022, a proposal was put forward which would have seen demolition of the existing building and construction of a new restaurant with office space above, however, plans were put on hold due to rising interest rates. The building has since received extensive renovations and now operates as Ing Bulgogi, a Korean BBQ-buffet restaurant.

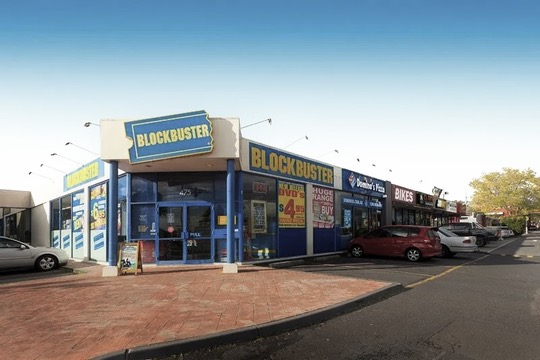
Blockbuster, 2012

The Mobil service station at the corner of Hanover Road and Burwood Highway, which was built in 1974, was replaced by a block of 14 brick shops in 1990. As part of Nunawading Council's 1992 structure plan for the Vermont South Activity Centre, a prominent council-owned block at the corner of Livingstone Road and Burwood Highway was rezoned from public use zone to restricted business zone. The plan also designated the area for a mix of office and retail development.

In 1994, Shell Australia proposed plans to subdivide the site for a 24-hour petrol station, a drive-through McDonald's restaurant, a Blockbuster video store, a cafe and several shops. The proposal caused controversy and objectors claimed it was a conflict of interest for the council as the sale of the land was conditional on council approving the subdivision.

Despite angst from the existing traders of the neighbouring Vermont South Shopping Centre, who feared overdevelopment, the project went ahead and was completed between 1995 and 1996. The Vermont South McDonald's restaurant opened in December 1995 and was remodelled in 2008. The Blockbuster tenancy was replaced by a Snap Fitness gymnasium in 2012.
