= Disneyland in Australia =

Proposals to open a Disneyland amusement park in Australia have existed since the late 1990s. However, the Walt Disney Company has never opened a Disneyland park in the Southern Hemisphere.

The majority of recent proposals have been in Melbourne and Adelaide.

== History ==
=== Unofficial "Australialand" proposal (1960) ===
Development Consolidated consortium directors, c1959

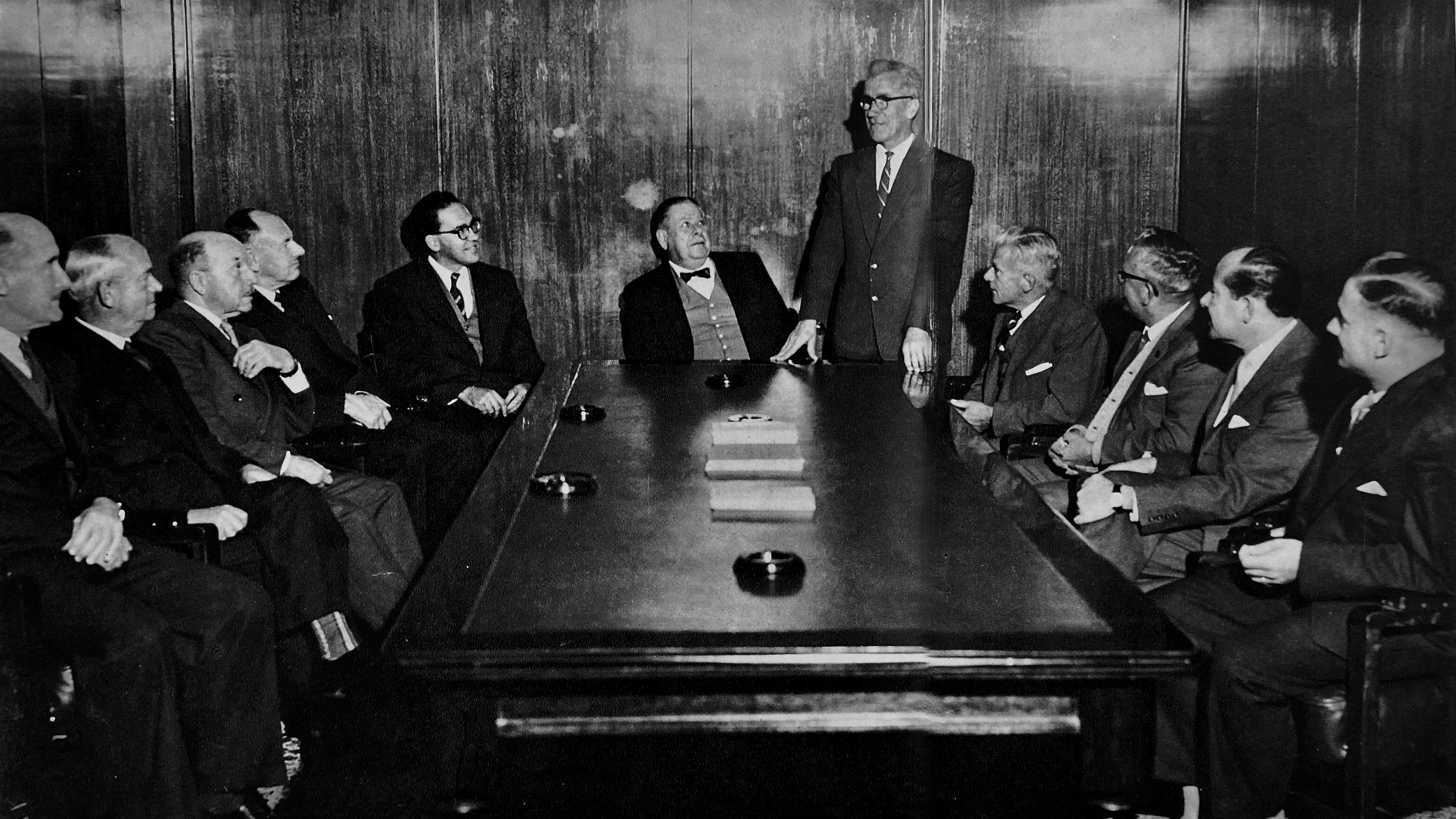
Reid Murray boardroom meeting in Melbourne, 1959

In July 1960, acting Victorian Premier Sir Thomas Maltby was advised by Forest Hill Heights, a private company associated with the Melbourne-based Development Consolidated (Devcon) consortium, of their plan to develop an unofficial Australian version of Disneyland on a greater-than 500 acre site at Geelong Road, Laverton with co-developer Paynes Properties, a subsidiary of Reid Murray Holdings. It was proposed the name of the site should be "Australialand". Devcon represented the interests of a small group of private lawyers and businesspeople, while Reid Murray was a public conglomerate with many thousands of shareholders.

In September 1960, the developers brought together three internationally experienced specialists to provide technical guidance. Among them was American Disney Imagineer and animator Harper Goff, best known for creating Disneyland's popular Storybook Land attraction. He was joined by Jacob Hamel, the Disney engineer responsible for the park's water systems and lighting design. The third consultant was English-born animator John Wilson, a former Disney artist who had recently relocated to Melbourne, where he established his own animation studio.

After learning of the proposal, Walt Disney's Australian representative, Walter A. Grainger, informed Disney's headquarters in Hollywood. Acting on behalf of the company, he subsequently delivered a strongly worded warning: “Walt Disney Productions and Disney Inc. of California, the originators and proprietors of ‘Disneyland’, deem it necessary, in the interest of the public and likely investors, to state that they have no connection with or interest in any proposed amusement park in Australia … Also, formal warning is given that the misuse of the name ‘Disneyland’ and the possible deception of the public may involve penalties at law.”

=== First talks of an official Disneyland park for Australia ===
The first reports of a proposal to build an official Disneyland park in Australia were in the 1990s, when a park was proposed on the Gold Coast. The Walt Disney Company reportedly liked the idea, but a last minute intervention saw the plan abandoned in favour of a park in China. Hong Kong Disneyland opened in 2005. In 2007, the Walt Disney Company itself proposed building a Disneyland Resort in Sydney, with the proposed name "Disney Wharf at Sydney Harbour". However, the company abandoned the plan due to hefty costs.

=== Recent proposals ===
In recent years, proposals for a Disneyland park in Australia have resurfaced, with the majority of proposals being in either Melbourne or Adelaide. A formal proposal was submitted by Disney APAC Regional Executive Gerard Devan to construct such a venue which was endorsed by Global AVP John Gelke but refused by CEO Robert Iger and VP Luke Kang, citing that the domestic population base would not be sufficient to support the requisite revenues to justify the venue.

In June 2024, David Limbrick, a Libertarian MP for the South-Eastern Metropolitan Region of the Victorian Legislative Council, proposed three potential locations for a Disneyland park in Melbourne. He suggested the southeastern suburbs of Cranbourne, Dandenong and Frankston as potential locations. Frankston Mayor Nathan Conroy supported the proposal.

== Proposed locations ==
Suburb	City	State	Original proponent(s)	Reference(s)
Avalon	Geelong	Victoria	Lindsay Fox	
Cranbourne	Melbourne	Victoria	David Limbrick	
Dandenong	Melbourne	Victoria	David Limbrick	
Elizabeth	Adelaide	South Australia	Amanda Blair	
Fishermans Bend, Port Melbourne	Melbourne	Victoria	Sally Capp	
Frankston	Melbourne	Victoria	David Limbrick	
McLaren Vale	Adelaide	South Australia	Warren Randall	
Yatala	Gold Coast	Queensland	Tom Tate	
