= Centerpoint Mall =

Centerpoint Mall or Centrepoint Mall may refer to:

- Centrepoint Mall (Melbourne), Australia
- Centerpoint Mall (Toronto), Canada
- Shops at CenterPoint, in Grand Rapids, Michigan, United States
- Center Point (disambiguation)#Buildings and shopping centers
