= Victorian Realty Service =

- Type: Private
- Industry: Real estate
- Founded: 1951
- Founder: Kevin Mulhall
- Defunct: 1962 (effectively); 1967 (legally)
- Fate: Merged
- Successor: K. J. Mulhall Pty Ltd
- Headquarters: Melbourne, Australia

Victorian Realty Service (or Victorian Realty) was a private Australian real estate agency active in Melbourne, Australia during the post-war property boom. It was overseen by Kevin Joseph Mulhall. The company were agents and auctioneers for many large-scale residential and commercial projects around the Melbourne's expanding metropolitan area. It was contracted by leading private developers including Isador Magid, Max Naumburger, Hans Bachrach, Paul Fayman, and Raymond Borg.

== 1954 parliamentary callout ==
In September 1954, Labor MP Peter Randles read a speech about widespread fraud in the Melbourne housing industry, alleging that Victorian Realty were running a "lucrative racket". He said that prospective home buyers had been given the impression of low commission fees, only to find they must pay higher. It was alleged that in some cases, Victorian Realty were charging £50 for commissions which should have amounted to £5. Mulhall had apparently been well known for hefty commissions in cash. One former associate recalled that Mulhall had once received a sum of £25,000 which he had to hide in his car luggage boot. The scandal influenced an amendment to the Real Estate Agent Act.

== 1960 purchase by Reid Murray ==
In August 1960, Reid Murray Holdings paid cash for Victorian Realty. This resulted in Mulhall leaving the company to form another. It was formally wound up by receivers in February 1967.
