= Paynes Properties =

Property developer in Victoria, Australia

- Type: Private
- Founded: 19 March 1958
- Key people: Raymond Borg
- Parent: Reid Murray Holdings

Paynes Properties Pty Ltd was a property development subsidiary of Reid Murray Holdings active in Victoria, Australia during the late 1950s and early 1960s.

== History ==
It effectively began in 1957 as a side activity of the Paynes Bon Marché department store chain under the direction of sales executive Raymond Borg, who developed a business model of building and selling affordable houses with low deposits. Approximately 800 contracts for low-deposit homes were reportedly signed in the first 16 months, leading to the formation of Paynes Properties as a Reid Murray subsidiary in 1958 with Borg in charge as managing director.

One of the inaugural residential subdivision undertaken by Paynes Properties was the Louisiana Estate in Mount Waverley, which was first offered for sale in late 1958. The company marketed allotments prior to the commencement of development, with contracts expressly conditional upon approval of the subdivision plan within 90 days. During the estate's launch, Paynes claimed to have sold 70 allotments in the first week of sales. Approval of the subdivision plan, however, was not granted until 1963, well beyond the contractual deadline, by which time the majority of purchasers had cancelled their contracts. Despite the contingent nature of the sales and the subsequent cancellations, Paynes recognised the projected proceeds in its 1958–59 and 1959–60 financial statements. Government investigators later concluded that this accounting treatment was inappropriate, finding that no profit should have been recognised because the contracts remained conditional and therefore did not constitute realised earnings. Auditors alleged that Paynes had also reported false profits from collapsed developments at Metung, Scoresby and Heathmont, affecting hundreds of would-be land buyers.

In April 1959, Paynes unveiled plans to develop a massive master-planned community of 10,000 homes known as the Sunbury Satellite Town. The project was masterminded by Raymond Borg and received early praise from Victorian premier Henry Bolte, who described it as "wonderful, bold and visionary". However, the project struggled to secure investment and progressed slowly. By mid-1960, criticism intensified after only a few dozen houses had been completed, far short of earlier projections. The development officially went bust in 1963 during the receivership of Reid Murray.

Paynes held a press conference with Development Consolidated in May 1959 to publicly announce their partnership on a landmark retail and housing project on the outskirts of suburban Melbourne. Plans had been prepared for an ultra-modern shopping centre and housing estate of over 200 homes. However, the centre was left partially built due to declining economic conditions and prolonged delays which eventually led to the project being aborted. The centre was later opened by Fayman under a different partnership in 1964 as the Forest Hill Shopping Centre. Paynes had also partnered with Fayman in 1960 to deliver the Australialand proposal, which sought to establish an Australian counterpart to Disneyland.

Government investigators found that decline of Paynes Properties resulted not simply from adverse business conditions, but from fundamentally flawed management, accounting practices and corporate governance. Inspectors concluded that the group's financial statements gave a "grossly misleading" picture of its profitability and financial position, with accounting techniques used to create "large and fictitious profits", and found that several transactions amounted to fraud. Reports tabled in parliament identified Borg as the central figure, concluding that his personal business interest, particularly those connected with his family and the Sunbury development, had become inextricably intertwined with those of Paynes. It found that numerous transactions between Paynes and Borg-controlled interests were "extremely and unjustifiably profitable" to the Borg family.
