= Livingstone Primary School =

Livingstone Primary School may refer to:

- Livingstone Primary School, Melbourne, a primary school in Melbourne, Australia
- Livingstone Primary School, Livingstone, a primary school in Livingstone, Zambia
