= Dandenong Square =

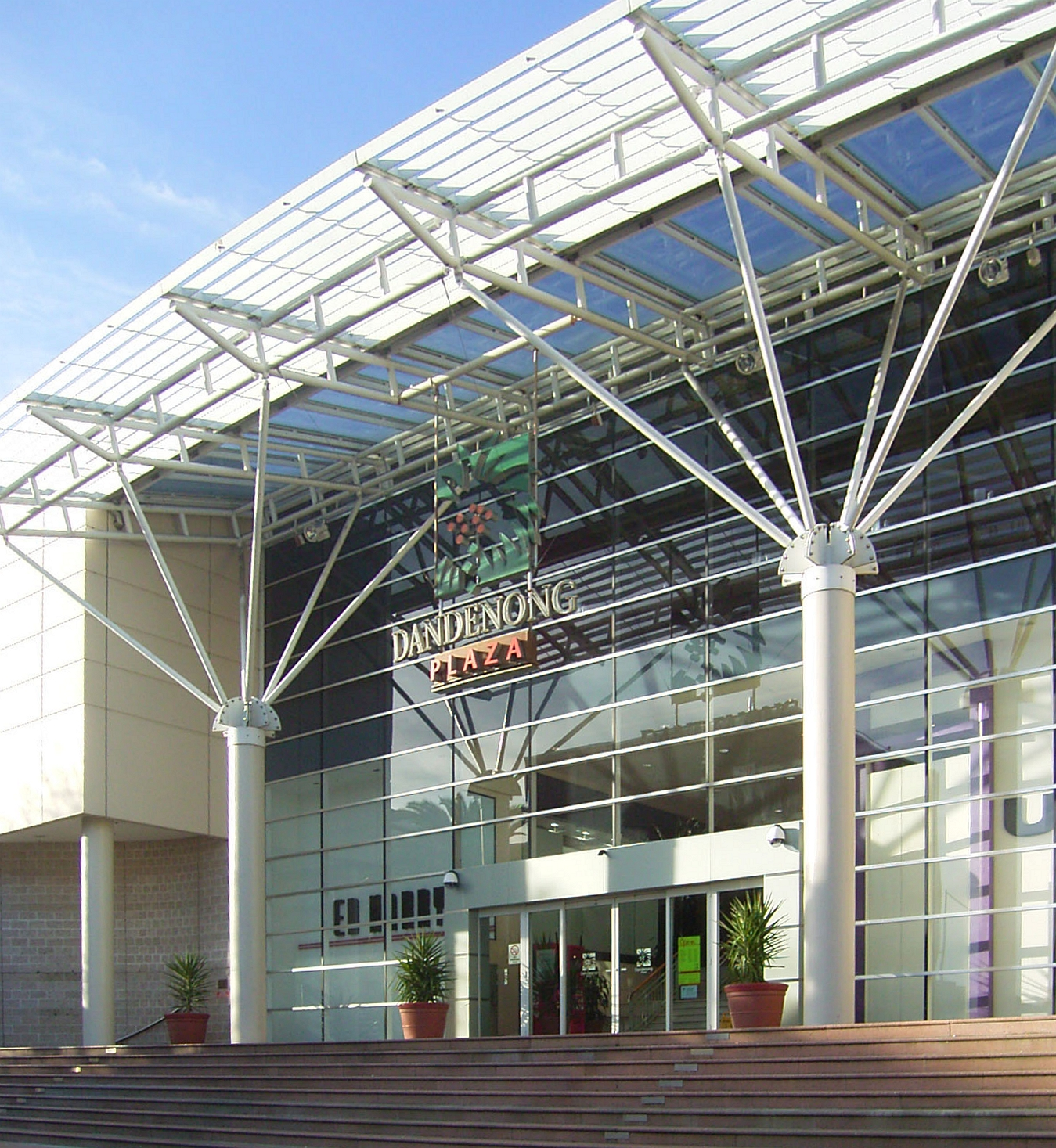
- The main entrance of Dandenong Square under the former Dandenong Plaza branding
- Location: Dandenong, Victoria, Australia
- Coordinates: 37.98673°S 145.21696°E
- Opened: 1989; 37 years ago
- Manager: RetPro
- Owner: Moelis Australia
- Num. of stores: 189
- Num. of anchor tenants: 5
- Floor area: 6,383 m^{2} (68,710 sq ft)
- Floors: 3
- Parking: 3,300
- Website: dandenongsquare.com

Dandenong Square, originally known as Dandenong Plaza, is a major-regional shopping centre located in the suburb of Dandenong, approximately 30 kilometres south-east of the Melbourne CBD. The centre has one large food court (outside Reading Cinemas on level 2). Level 3 has a large Fresh Food Hall outside the Coles supermarket. Dandenong Square is near the Dandenong Market and also Dandenong Hub.

== History ==
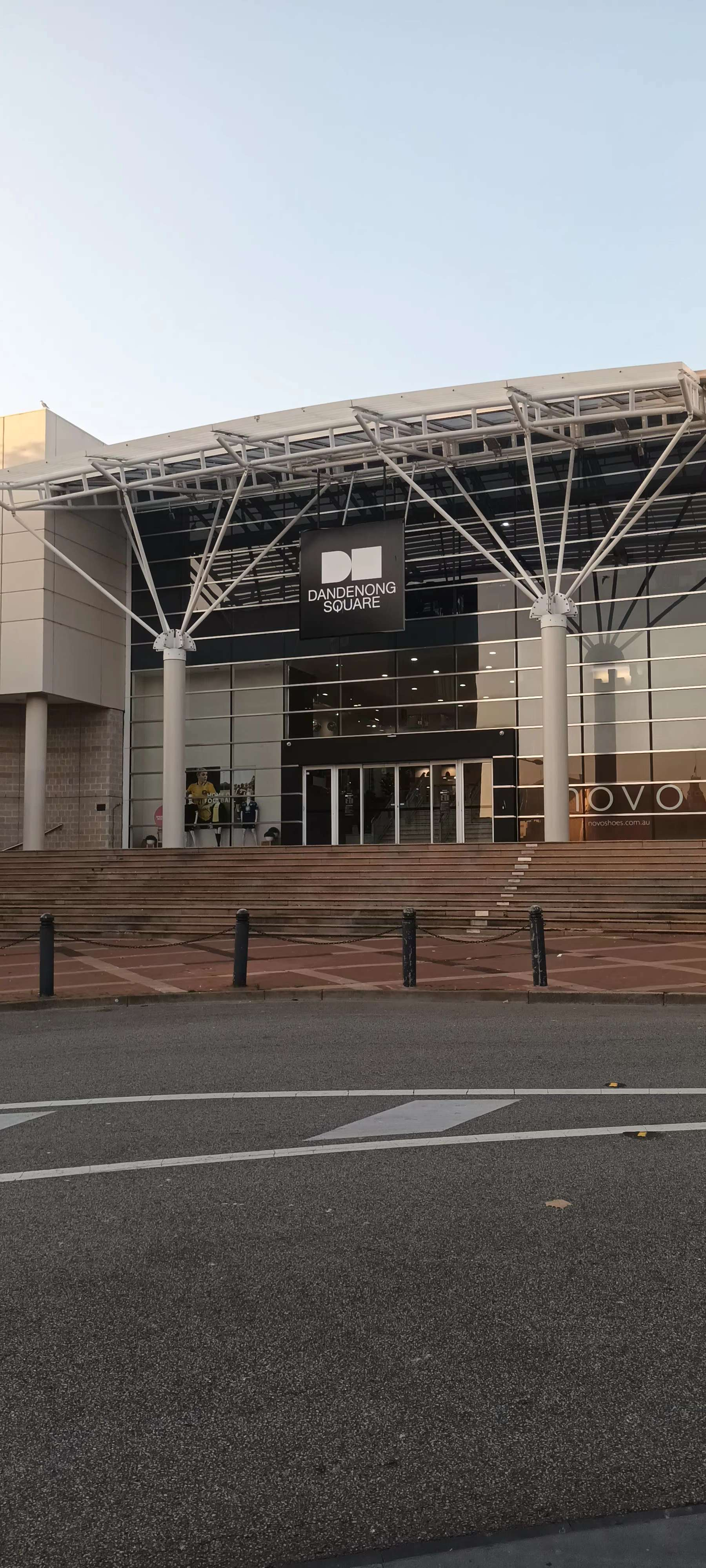
The main entrance to Dandenong Square under the current branding.

Myer opened in Dandenong as a four-level standalone department store on 4 November 1974. In 1989, a shopping centre opened on the corner of Foster and McCrae Streets, initially named Capital Centre, it was later renamed Dandenong Plaza, coinciding with an expansion of the centre in 1995 linking it with Myer. In 2024, Armada Dandenong Plaza was rebranded to Dandenong Square.

== Retailers ==
Dandenong Square currently has 76,383 m^{2} (822,180 sq ft) of floor space on three levels.

=== Major Anchors ===
- Kmart
- Aldi
- Coles
- Woolworths
- Reading Cinemas

=== Minor Anchors ===
- The Reject Shop
- Nando's
- Cotton On
- Best & Less

=== Former Anchors ===
- Myer (closed 13 October 2013)
- Target (closed 9 July 2022)
- Village Cinemas (closed in 2008)
- Trade Secret (replaced by TK Maxx)
- JB Hi-Fi Home (relocated to Dandenong South)
- EB Games (closed in around somewhere in 2020)
- Daiso (closed in 2023)
- Rebel (closed in 2026 & relocated to Parkmore)
- TK Maxx (closed in 2026 & relocated to Parkmore)
- Lincraft (closed in 2026)
