= Masaga Group =

Australian property development group (1964–1980)

- Logo for Masaga Holdings
- Type: Private
- Industry: Real estate development
- Predecessor: Development Consolidated; Retail Development Co.
- Founded: 1964
- Defunct: 1980
- Fate: Dissolved
- Successor: Hanover Holdings Ltd
- Headquarters: Elsternwick, Victoria; Melbourne CBD
- Area served: Greater Melbourne area
- Key people: Paul Fayman; Maurice Alter; George Herscu
- Divisions: Masaga Developments; Masaga Investments
- Subsidiaries: See list in article body

The Masaga Group was a privately owned real estate and industrial group based in Melbourne, Australia. During the mid-to-late 1960s, it was involved in the development of shopping strips, supermarkets, office buildings, residential estates and homes across Melbourne's expanding suburbs.

The group brought together the business interests of several entrepreneurs and grew rapidly during the post-war development boom. In 1969, its interests were reorganised under the public company Hanover Holdings, which significantly benefitted from the tail end of the boom during the early 1970s.

The combined multi-billion dollar fortunes of Maurice Alter and George Herscu can be traced back to the Masaga group, which reportedly controlled over $3m of property by 1969 (equivalent to $40m in 2022).

== Formation ==
Paul Fayman was described in contemporary media as the group's "kingpin" and "financial expert". Born in Poland, he came to Melbourne in 1952 and initially worked as a wholesale butcher, building up a large chain of delicatessens with several associates. He briefly co-owned the Esplanade Hotel during the 1956 Summer Olympics, but soon sold out and partnered with a different group of investors to buy another delicatessen chain. This partnership was successful and soon diversified, leading to the formation of Development Consolidated, a private real estate and industrial consortium.

Forest Hills, c1968

Maurice Alter and George Herscu, the group's other main figures, were also European immigrants who settled in Melbourne after the war. Herscu entered the milk bar trade in the early 1950s with Zygmunt Singlust, acquiring and renovating businesses for resale. Later in the decade, they expanded into shopping strip developments with Alter, who had independently entered the retail property sector. A financial dispute in 1960 ended Herscu and Singlust's partnership, after which Herscu and Alter continued their business association, forming the Retail Development Co.

The three men were brought together through their development of the Forest Hills Shopping Centre. Originally proposed by Fayman in 1957 as a major retail development, the project collapsed when his vital co-developer Reid Murray went into receivership. In 1964, Alter and Herscu acquired the partly completed centre from Fayman and his consortium, which retained a 25 per cent interest. The centre opened in June that year and proved highly successful, providing the basis for the consolidation of their property interests under the Masaga group. The centre had Australia's first Safeway-branded supermarket and was regarded at the time as a pioneering development for Victoria.

== Business activities ==
Masaga developed numerous shops across Melbourne's expanding outer suburbs, favouring prominent sites along major roads, at street corners, near railway stations and in other areas of high pedestrian traffic. Most were retained as long-term leasehold investments. The group also developed larger department stores and supermarkets, which were typically leased to national retailers including Coles, Lindsays and Woolworths under long-term agreements. As of 2026, some of these premises remain occupied by the same retailers, although ownership has since changed.

The group also developed retail and office premises on surplus land leased from the Victorian Government, which it subsequently sublet to tenants. One of its more prominent projects was a multi-level concourse at Glen Waverley railway station, incorporating retail and office space. Office accommodation also featured in several larger developments, including a mixed-use complex at Forest Hill containing offices, a medical clinic and a sports centre with recreational facilities. They also built the Sale headquarters of the BHP-Esso joint venture during the Bass Strait oil boom.

Burntbridge Shopping Centre, c1969

Other commercial ventures included licensed restaurants at Forest Hill and Altona North, which were leased to independent operators, and an auditorium designed to television studio specifications at the Forest Hills Shopping Centre. The centre also housed a radio broadcasting booth occupied by Radio 3XY. The group unsuccessfully attempted to an inner-city industrial estate where Arden railway station is today.

Although best known for its commercial properties, Masaga also undertook substantial land subdivision projects. Its largest residential development was on the former Amstel Park golf course at Mount Waverley, where approximately 400 allotments were created. The group also developed some of the first housing estates in Vermont South.

=== Archalt partnership ===
In 1965, Masaga partnered with leather manufacturer Charles Zuker to buy the Newport Freezing Works, which had a license to export packaged meat. According to Fayman, they initially considered redeveloping the entire site for housing, but instead sold off a portion of the land and kept the historic business going, undertaking a modernisation and expansion program. Despite disputes with trade unions, the business was highly successful and employed a staff of over 900 at its peak. The facility and its tenants were reportedly on track to export $20 million of mear overseas in 1969 alone. The partnership also owned the former Clare Castle Hotel, a run-down venue on Exhibition Street, which they later resold for a significant profit.

== Administration ==
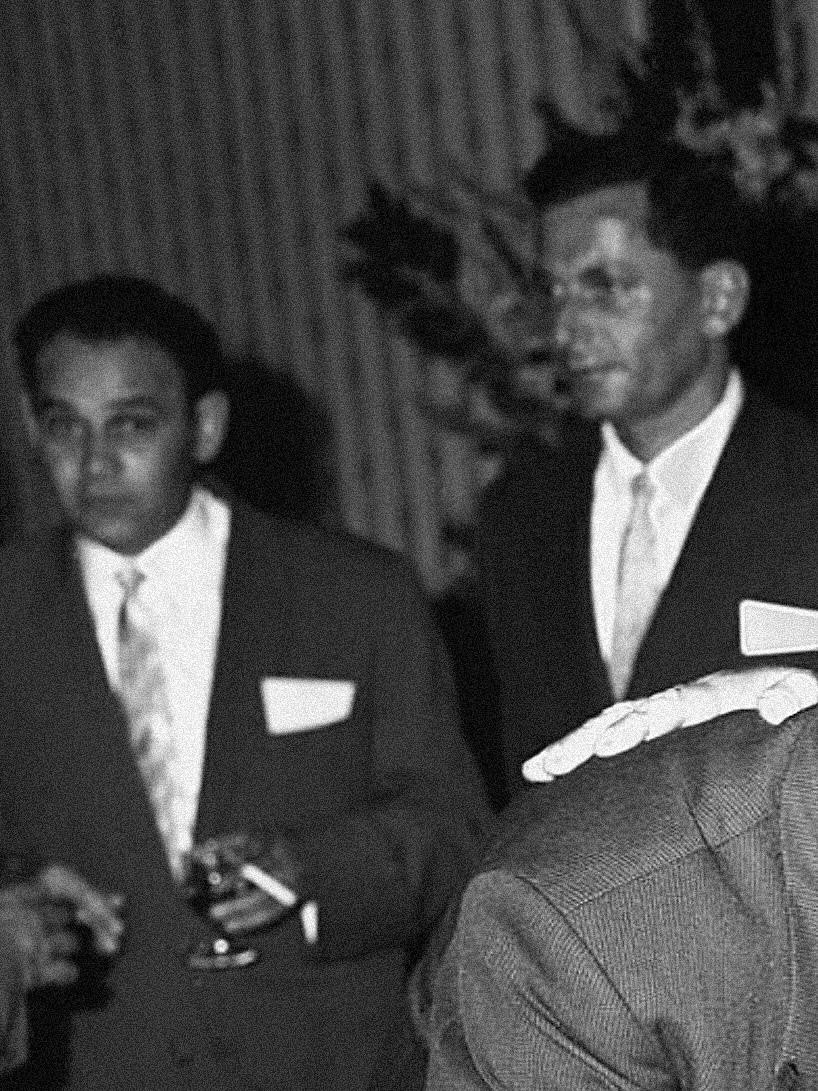
Paul Fayman (left) with Leon Velik

Paul Fayman was in charge of managing the group and controlling its expenditure across the board. His business partners, Maurice Slonim and Leon Velik, co-owned a prominent law firm which provided legal services to the group under a partnership. They belonged to established local business families, who were vital in supporting the group's negotiation of loan funds with financial institutions such as Lensworth.

Having all emigrated from Europe, the directors were brought together by their shared Jewish faith and wartime experiences. Journalist Ruth Ostrow characterised them as part of a broader category of migrant businessmen, who rose from modest backgrounds to financial success during Australia's post-war economic boom and operated outside the traditional Anglo establishment.

The group's anonymous in-house architect was Thord Lorich: a Norwegian-born designer who had previously designed homes for Luigi Grollo. He began working for Masaga after a successful stint as the architect for their Forest Hill centre. Masaga also had its own real estate agents and consultants.

The profitability of the group's leasehold investments was protected by "provision for a periodic increased in rentals to business turnovers." Furthermore, tenants paid all rates and taxes in addition to rent, so that the cost to the group after construction would theoretically only be land tax. In 1981, government investigators Patrick McCabe and David Lafranchi alleged that the Masaga Group and its directors were among the primary beneficiaries of bottom-of-the-harbour tax avoidance strategies, and perhaps some of the first to employ it on a wide scale in Victoria.

== Key developments ==
Crystal Forest restaurant, 1968

Mixed-used building at Forest Hill

Glen Waverley station, 1984

Amstel Park estate, 1968

Opened	Name/type	Location	Ref
1964	Forest Hill Shopping Centre	Canterbury Road, Forest Hill	
1965	Tyson Street shops	Tyson Street, Fawkner	
1966	Amstel Park estate	Off Stephensons Road, Mt Waverley	
1966	Glen Waverley station entrance	Kingsway, Glen Waverley	
1966	Noble Park Central	Douglas & Buckley Streets, Noble Park	
1966	Bellerive Avenue shops	Bellerive Ave, Mount Waverley	
1966	Ringwood Central	Maroondah Highway, Ringwood	
c1966	Shops	Alfrieda Street, St Albans?	
1966	Row of shops	Ross Smith Avenue East, Frankston	
1966	Shops and offices	South Gippsland Highway, Cranbourne	
1966	Row of shops	Main Street, Croydon	
1966	Shopping strip	Off Brice Avenue, Mooroolbark	
1967	Corner shopping strip	Jukes Rd & Bonwick St, Fawkner	
1967	Shopping strip	Mahoneys Road, Forest Hill	
1967	Supermarket for Coles	Belmore Road, Balwyn East	
1967	Retail Development House	Riddell Parade, Elsternwick	
1967	Jackson Court S. C. (north)	Mitchell Street, Doncaster East	
1967	Corner restaurant	Mahoneys Road, Forest Hill	
1968	Bolton Street shops	Bolton Street, Eltham	
1968	Forest Hills Theatre	Mahoneys Road, Forest Hill	
1969	Burwood Heights estate	Off Burwood Highway, Vermont South	
1969	Station Arcade	Dorset Road, Boronia	
1969	Multipurpose building	Mahoneys Road, Forest Hill	
1969	Burntbridge S. C.	Maroondah Highway, Croydon	
1969	Raybond Building	Raymond & Bond Streets, Sale	
1969	Unit complex	Glebe Street, Forest Hill	
1969	North Melbourne factoryettes	Arden Street, North Melbourne	
1969	Unit complex	Mahoneys Road, Forest Hill	
1969	Supermarket for Coles	Raymond Street, Sale	
1969	Bundoora Arcade	Plenty Road, Bundoora	
1969	Department store for Lindsay's	Smith Street, Collingwood	

== Restructuring and dissolution ==
In early 1969, Masaga executives executed a reverse takeover of hire-purchase business Allans Finance, which they immediately restructured and renamed to Hanover Holdings. This involved Hanover acquiring around $3m (equivalent to approximately $45m in 2025) worth of leasehold shops and freehold developments from the Masaga group. Following the creation of Hanover Holdings, some companies previously associated with the Masaga group (such as Masaga Holdings) remained active as separate entities. An example of this was Forest Hill Heights, which managed the group's Forest Hill Shopping Centre. Hanover was privatised in 1976 and its assets were split amongst its founders.

=== Companies within the Masaga group (prior to 1969 restructuring) ===
- Altona Hotel – Management company for the Altona Hotel (now Miller's Inn).
- Altona Investments Co. – Management and holdings company for properties in Altona North.
- Alter Nominees – Nominee company for Maurice Alter.
- Archalt Investments – Management company for joint venture with Charles Zuker.
- Archalt Properties – Management company for joint venture with Charles Zuker.
- Burwood Heights – Management and holdings company for subdivisional properties in Vermont South (then Burwood East)
- Dobra Development Co. – Management company for a terminated joint venture with the Morden family.
- Fernlee Estates – Associated with the group's Amstel Park development in Mount Waverley.
- Forest Hill Heights – Management company for the Forest Hill Shopping Centre and associated buildings.
- Gillian Development – Corporate vehicle associated with Maurice Alter.
- Herscal Developments – Group of twenty shell companies associated with subdivisions in the Altona area.
- Herscu Nominees – Nominee company acting on behalf of George Herscu.
- Lenstel Enterprises – Associated with the group's Amstel Park development in Mount Waverley.
- Masaga Holdings – Holdings company controlled by Masaga.
- Masaga Investments – Developer of retail and office buildings in Victoria.
- Masaga (N.S.W.) – Management company for the acquisition of properties in Sydney
- Masaga Nominees – Nominee company controlled by Masaga directors
- Newport Freezing Works – Meat processing company part-owned by Masaga directors.
- Parfew Nominees – Nominee company acting on behalf of Paul Fayman.
- Parring Development – Home building venture based within Masaga's Amstel Park development.
- Retail Development – Developer of retail and office buildings in Victoria.
- Riddell Investments – Management company for redevelopment projects in Elsternwick.
- Starbrite Development – Corporate vehicle associated with George Herscu.

=== Companies within the Masaga group (after 1969 restructuring) ===
- Dobra Development Company – Management company for a terminated joint venture with the Morden family.
- Fash – Development operation based in Canberra.
- Forest Hill Heights – Management company for the Forest Hill Shopping Centre and associated buildings.
- Herscal Developments – Group of twenty companies associated with subdivisions in the Altona area.
- Masaga Holdings – Holdings company controlled by Masaga.
- Masaga Investments – Developer of retail and office buildings in Victoria.
- Masaga (N.S.W.) – Management company for the acquisition of properties in Sydney
- Montvale Developments – Project manager for upgrades to Forest Hill Shopping Centre, involved in BLF corruption scandal.
- Southern Dynamics – Sydney-based manufacturing company acquired by Masaga for a proposed hotel development.
