= Development Consolidated =

Australian private consortium (1958–1964)

Development Consolidated Pty Ltd
- Directors of the consortium, c1958 (L–R: Joseph Emanuel, Sadie Slonim, Jack Sharpe, Gloria Velik, Paul Fayman, Berenice Emanuel, Cecil Sharpe, Miriam Sharpe, Leon Velik, Faye Fayman, Joy Sharpe)
- Type: Private
- Industry: Entertainment; Food; Manufacturing; Realestate; Retail
- Founded: 1958
- Defunct: 1965 (effectively); 1968 (legally)
- Fate: Dissolved
- Successor: Masaga Group
- Headquarters: Lombard Building (1958–1961); Bank of Adelaide Building (1961–1968)
- Area served: Australia
- Key people: Paul Fayman; Jack Sharpe; Joseph Emanuel; Leon Velik; Maurice Slonim
- Services: Financing
- Subsidiaries: See list in article body

Development Consolidated (also known as Devcon) was a highly-private Melbourne-based consortium that operated between 1958 and 1965. It brought together business interests associated with several prominent Melbourne families, with activities spanning real estate, manufacturing, food production, retail and entertainment. The partnership began to unravel in 1961 amid a series of financial and legal disputes with external parties, although some of its directors continued to pursue joint ventures afterwards.

== Corporate affairs ==
In 1958, Polish-born entrepreneur Paul Fayman pooled capital with investors Maurice Slonim, Leon Velik, Jack Sharpe, and Joseph Emanuel to buy the Wright Bros chain of delicatessens. The business, which was a prominent local name at the time, had reportedly begun during the interwar period with a single cheese shop at Prahran Market before opening various branch stores during the post-war years.

The new directors began a diversification program, forming subsidiary companies that carried the prominent Wright Bros name in the real estate, retail, food, and wholesaling industries. Its almost immediate success lead to the formation of Development Consolidated (Devcon for short) as a mutually-beneficial consortium jointly owned by the directors and their family members.

The name Development Consolidated was highly similar to Consolidated Development: a different consortium from the era that was associated with LJ Hooker.

== Real estate ==
Clearing of trees for a Devcon housing estate at Blackburn South, 1959

Devcon was best known for its speculative land subdivision and housing projects in Melbourne, particularly in the city's outer eastern suburbs, which were rapidly expanding to accommodate new citizens after the Second World War. Its developments were usually built in the American-style tract housing arrangement, and were marketed towards those seeking the Australian Dream of owning a house on a block.

Land title documents suggest that the consortium created approximately 1000 residential allotments in the Shire of Mulgrave alone. Two of these developments were in Ashwood, which were co-developed with Aaron Nirens and created a large part of the suburb.

Devcon, among various other leading private developers at the time, sometimes did not provide sealed roads on their subdivisions. This would significantly contribute to the Shire of Mulgrave's exhaustion of its £100,000 overdraft on private street construction in 1958, which lead to councils across Victoria adopting legislation that required subdividers to build sealed roads. Fayman later recalled "In those days it was so easy, you could sell of a map, you didn't even need to make roads".

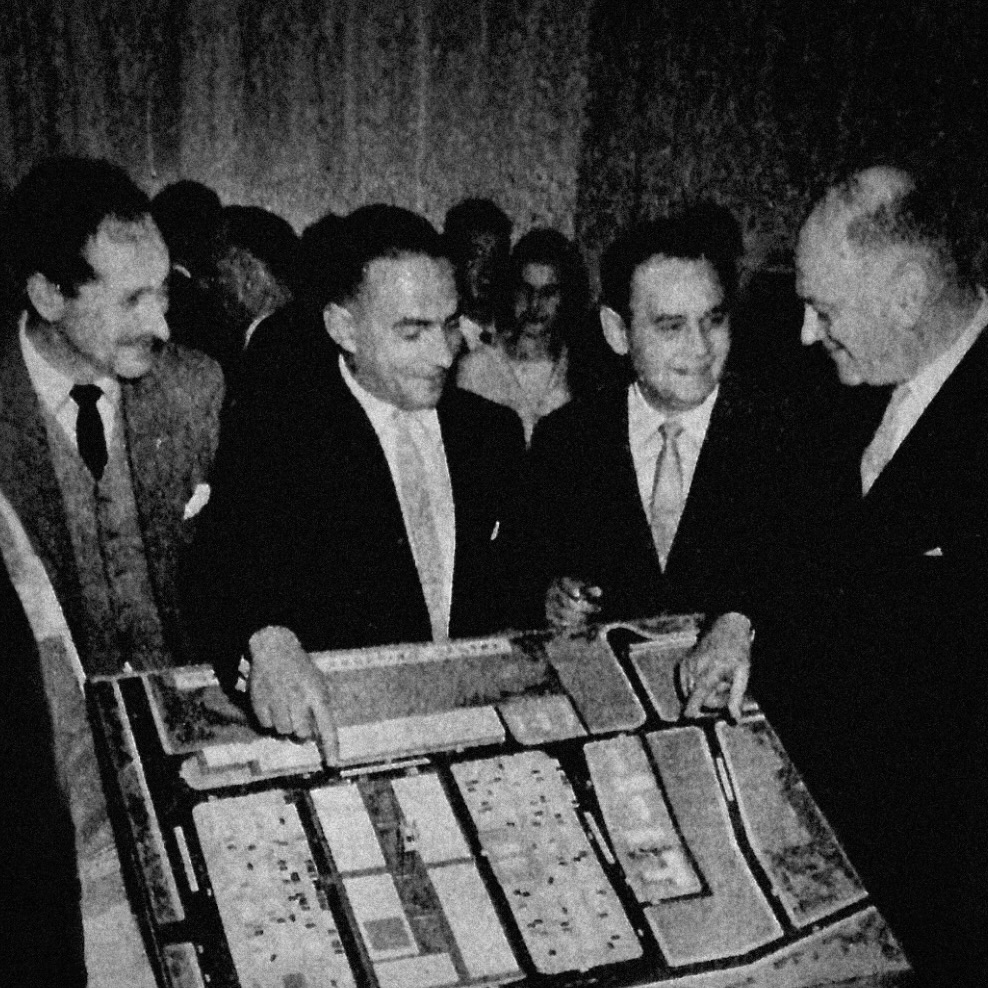
(L–R) Architect Leslie Perrot Jnr and developers Raymond Borg, Paul Fayman and Joseph Emanuel pictured at the 1959 press conference, announcing their £6m joint venture at Forest Hill.

Multiple speculative proposals were put forward by the group during the late 1950s, which were often only partially realised or abandoned altogether. Directors Paul Fayman and Joseph Emanuel were particularly fond of a proposed "ultra-modern" satellite town in Forest Hill, which was to include one of Australia's largest regional shopping centres alongside homes, parks, clinics, a hotel, and recreational facilities.

The project became a joint venture with Stanhill Consolidated and Paynes Properties, which bought out a controlling interest. The original proposal would ultimately fail due to a range of factors including the bankruptcy and later imprisonment of key developers Raymond Borg (manager of Paynes Properties) and Stanley Korman (chairman of Stanhill Consolidated).

(L–R) Developer Raymond Borg, Victorian Premier Henry Bolte, and chairman of Reid Murray Oswald O'Grady at the 1959 Sunbury Satellite Town launch.

Devcon had several other real estate ventures with Borg, including in Mount Waverley, Blackburn South, Sunbury and Burwood East (only the latter of which was successful). Their joint Sunbury proposal was intended to provide a masterplanned satellite town with ten thousand homes serviced by six shopping centres, an industrial estate, hotels, and extensive municipal/recreational facilities. The proposal was described by Victorian Premier Henry Bolte as "wonderful", "bold" and "visionary".

The Sunbury plans were later scrutinised by government investigators, who held the view that the whole scheme was a "swindle" that had been falsely promoted by Borg with the intent to funnel Devcon's funds into the private accounts of his family.

The allegations saw Development Consolidated take Borg to the Supreme Court. This, combined with other factors, saw Payne's parent company Reid Murray put into a significant bankruptcy. Reports state that the Sunbury scheme was organised by Borg, who allegedly employed psychological manipulation and fraudulent accounting practises to mislead Devcon and the executives of Reid Murray.

=== Australialand proposal ===
Devcon also attempted to establish an Australian answer to Disneyland with Paynes on a pastoral land just beyond Melbourne. Researcher Derham Groves claimed that the venture fell apart shortly after Walt Disney's Australian representative issued a copyright infringement warning. Another unrealised proposal by Devcon was their plan to build a regional shopping centre in Glen Waverley, years before a different developer would establish what is today The Glen Shopping Centre on a nearby site.

=== List of completed developments ===
Opened	Name	Type	Location	Co-developers	Notes/refs
1958	Ashwood Heights	Housing	Ashwood	Aaron Nirens	
1958	Burwood Heights	Housing	Ashwood	Aaron Nirens	
1958	Huntingdale Estate	Housing	Mount Waverley	Glen Bay Heights	
1959	Highburn Estate	Housing	Mount Waverley	Irvin Rockman	
1959	Tally Ho Shops	Retail	Mount Waverley	Irvin Rockman	
1959	Syndal Heights	Housing	Mount Waverley	–	
1959	Chadstone Park	Housing	Mount Waverley	–	
1959	Cameron Estate	Housing	Burwood East	Reid Murray	
1959	Borrack Estate	Housing	Altona North	Leighton	
1959	Unnamed	Housing	Springvale	–	
1960	Unnamed	Housing	Clayton	–	
1960	Warragul Park	Housing	Warragul	Glen Bay Heights	
1960	ICI Employees Estate	Housing	Deer Park	–	
1961	Borrack Square	Retail	Altona North	–Leighton	
1963	Ellmoor Heights	Housing	Doncaster East	–	
1963	Hotel Monash	Hotel/Motel	Clayton	–	
1963	Star Bowl	Recreation	Shepparton	–	
1963	Eliza Downs	Housing	Frankston	–	
1964	Condon Estate	Housing	Burwood	–	
1964	Forest Hill S. C.	Retail	Forest Hill	Retail Development Co.	
1964	Unnamed	Housing	Clayton South	–	
1965	Valency Court	Housing	Mitcham	–	
1965	Woodburn Heights	Flats	Toorak	–	

=== List of uncompleted developments or proposals ===
Proposed	Name/description	Location	Co-developers	Notes	Sources
1958	Louisiana Estate	Mount Waverley	Reid Murray Holdings		
1958	Forest Hill Heights	Forest Hill	Reid Murray Holdings		
1959	Offices and clinics	Glen Waverley	Unspecified		
1959	Kingsway Estate	Glen Waverley	Unspecified		
1959	Fulton Heights estate	Blackburn South	Reid Murray Holdings		
1959	Sunbury Satellite Town	Sunbury	Reid Murray Holdings		
1959	Shopping Centre	Glen Waverley	Unspecified		
1960	Australialand	Laverton	Reid Murray Holdings		

== Retailing ==
During the early 1960s, the consortium were the sole Australian agents for Scopitone film jukeboxes.

== Entertainment ==
Joseph Emanuel, a key director of the Development Consolidated, briefly served on the executive committee of an Australian World Exposition project before resigning due an unspecified conflict of interest.

== Subsidiaries and associated companies ==
- Altona Hotel; Altona Investment Co; Burwood Heights; Cameron Advertisements; Cameron Estates (Vic); Cameron Investments; Cameron Listings; Chadstone Park; Clendon Court; Complete Finance; Credit House Development; Danston Home Builders; Danston Home Furnishers; Devcon Builders; Ellmoor Heights; Fayman Holdings; Forest Hill Heights; Fulton Heights; Fulton Realty; Gippsland Acceptance Co; Highburn Estates; Hotel Monash; Huntingdale Estate; Kismet Heights; Louisiana Investments; Quantum Development; Redwood Heights; Residential Estates; Shepparton Indoor Bowling; Slomore; Sunbury Developments; Syndal Heights; Waverley Views Estate; Woodburn Heights.
