= Maurice Alter =

Australian developer (1925–2018)

Moses "Maurice" Alter
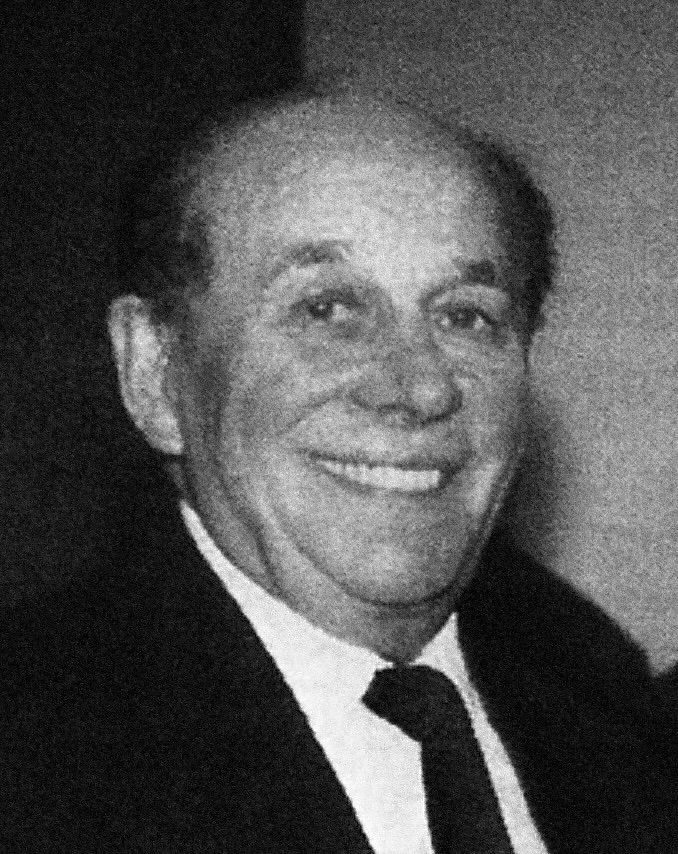
- Born: 30 March 1925; Siedliszcze, Poland
- Died: 13 April 2018 (aged 93); Melbourne, Australia
- Burial place: Melbourne Chevra Kadisha
- Citizenship: Australia (since 1955)
- Occupations: Property developer Company director
- Years active: c1955–2018
- Board member of: Masaga Group (1964–80); Hanover Holdings (1969–78); Pacific Group (1979–2018)
- Children: 2

Moses "Maurice" Alter (30 March 1925 – 13 April 2018) was a Polish-born Australian property developer, billionaire and philanthropist. He co-founded the Masaga Group in 1964, which built commercial sites in suburban Melbourne. It went public in 1969 as Hanover Holdings. Alter founded the Pacific Group in 1979.

== Biography ==
Maurice Alter was born at Szedliszcz in eastern Poland, to parents Joseph and Brachell Alter. He arrived in Australia as a displaced person in 1939, settling in Melbourne's inner suburbs. He studied electrical engineering by correspondence, later taking on a job selling real estate while on night shift as a maintenance technician in a textile factory. Alter made his first real estate investment during the mid-1950s through the purchase of two shops and a bank in Kew.

He partnered with European-born developers George Herscu and Zygmunt Singlust in the late 1950s, and they began building shops and milk bars in Melbourne's growing outer-suburbs. A financial dispute in 1960 led to Singlust's departure from the partnership. Alter's first major project was the Forest Hill Shopping Centre, which opened in 1964 and was developed in partnership with Herscu and a consortium led by Paul Fayman. Out of the venture the partners formed the Masaga Group.

Masaga went public in 1969 through a strategic reverse takeover, transforming a relatively-obscure finance company into a development group known as Hanover Holdings, thus avoiding the regulatory complexities of an IPO. Alter led Hanover Properties: a principal subsidiary which developed and managed property for retention as permanent investments.

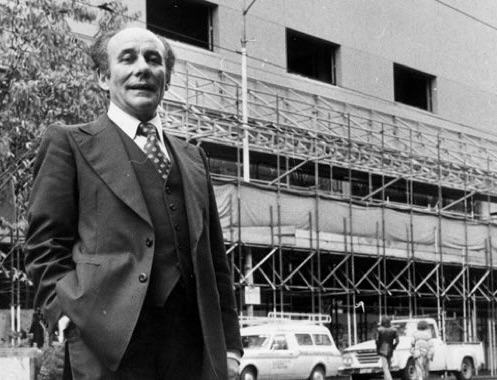
Alter outside Centrepoint Mall, 1970s

Hanover profited immensely during the early-1970s real estate boom, particularly with its housing projects and shopping centres. The company’s success during this period laid foundation for Maurice Alter’s later billionaire wealth. By 1979, the Alter-Herscu-Fayman partnership moved to privatise and dissolve Hanover. Alter retained a significant portfolio of commercial and industrial land, forming the basis of a new venture, Pacific Shopping Centres, which developed numerous large shopping complexes mainly in Victoria throughout the 1980s, 1990s and 2000s.

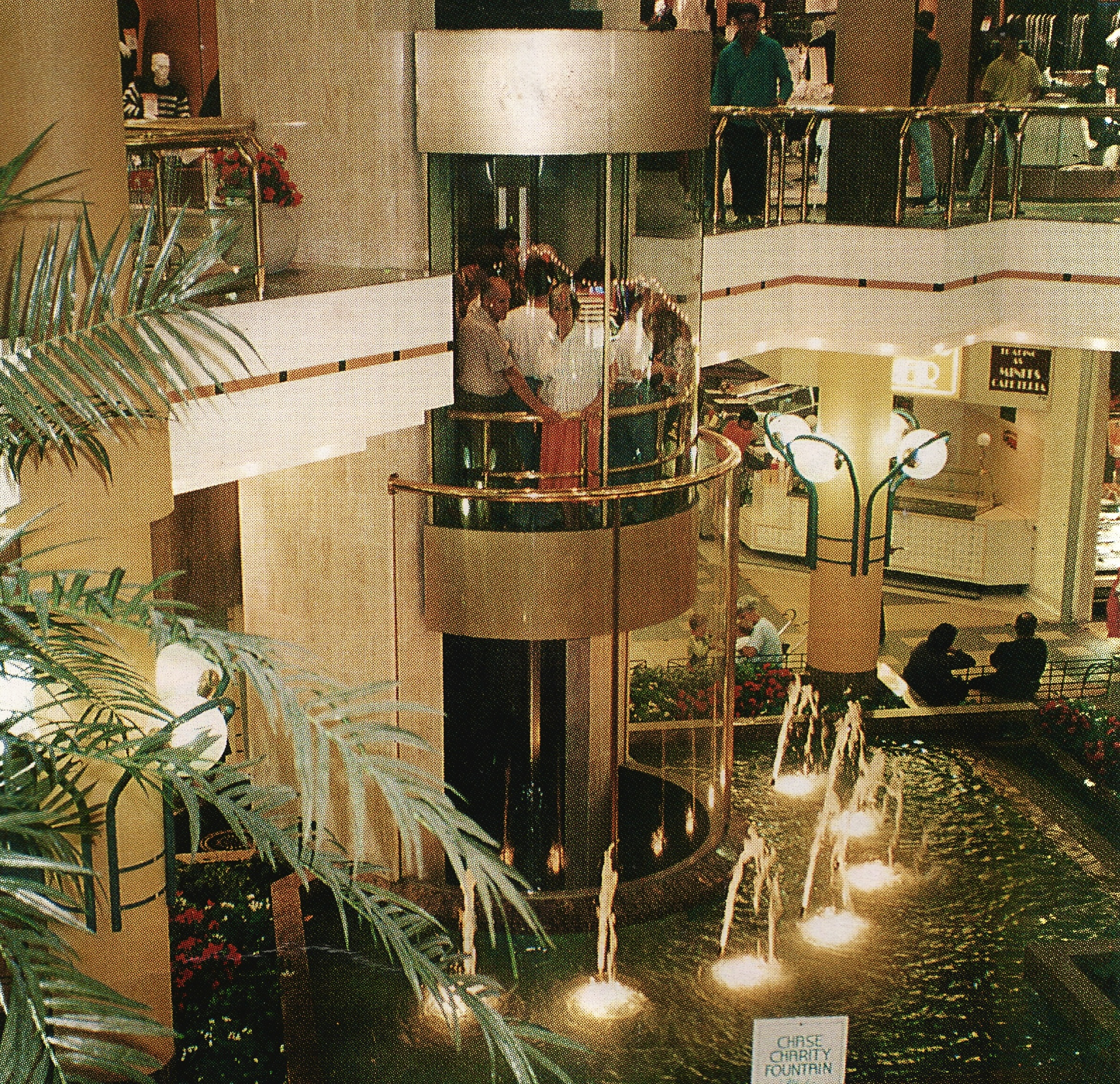
Forest Hill Chase, 1990

He died aged 93, on 13 April 2018, and is buried at the Melbourne Chevra Kadisha. The Pacific Group remains a family business.

== Notable developments ==
Opened	Name	Location
1964	Forest Hills Shopping Centre	Canterbury Road, Forest Hill
1966	Glen Waverley station entrance	Kingsway, Glen Waverley
1968	Forest Hills Theatre	Mahoneys Road, Forest Hill
1969	Burntbridge Shopping Centre	Beufort Road, Ringwood East
1969	Bundoora Arcade	Plenty Road, Bundoora
1974	Vermont South Shopping Centre	Burwood Highway, Vermont South
1978	Pran Central	Chapel Street, Prahran
1978	Flinders Fair	Flinders Sreett, Melbourne
1978	Tooronga Village Redevelopment	Toorak Road, Glen Iris
1979	Centrepoint Mall	Bourke Street, Melbourne
1980	Footscray Hub	Nicholson Street, Footscray
1982	Myer Centrepoint	David Street, Albury
1983	Sunshine Plaza	Hampshire Road, Sunshine
1985	Pacific Werribee	Heaths Road, Hoppers Crossing
1987	Coles Group National Headquarters	Toorak Road, Hawthorn East
1989	Forest Hill Chase Redevelopment	Canterbury Road, Forest Hill
1995	Pacific Epping	High Street, Epping

== Net worth ==
Prior to his death in 2018, Alter was one of ten individuals listed on every Financial Review Rich List since the first list was published in 1984.

Year	Financial Review Rich List		Forbes Australia's 50 Richest	
Year	Rank	Net worth (A$)	Rank	Net worth (US$)
2011			32 ▼	$0.70 billion ▲
2012			30 ▲	$0.78 billion ▲
2013			32 ▼	$0.89 billion ▲
2014			30 ▲	$0.96 billion ▲
2015			19 ▲	$1.20 billion ▲
2016			24 ▼	$1.10 billion ▼
2017		$1.81 billion	20 ▲	
2018	26 ▲	$2.26 billion ▲	$2.60 billion ▼44 ▼	

Legend
Icon	Description
Steady	Has not changed from the previous year
▲	Has increased from the previous year
▼	Has decreased from the previous year
