= George Herscu =

Australian property developer (1928–2013)

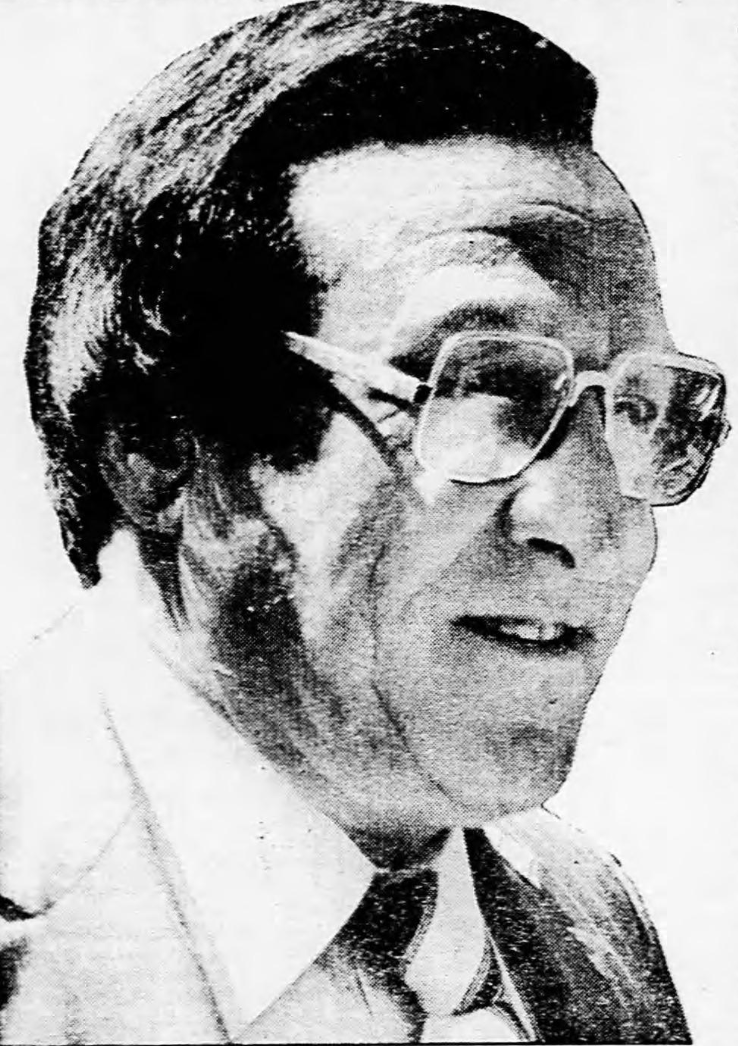
- Born: 1 February 1928; Bucharest
- Died: 12 December 2013 (aged 85); Los Angeles
- Burial place: Hillside Memorial Park
- Occupation: Property developer
- Board member of: Masaga Holdings (1964–77); Hanover Holdings (1969–77); Hersfield Developments (1977–1992); LJ Hooker (1986–87)
- Criminal charges: Corruption (1995)
- Spouse: Sheila Bloom (m. 1958)
- Children: 3
- Parents: Jacob Herscu (father); Liza Herscu (mother)

Israel ben Jacob Liza (Hebrew: ישראל בן יעקב, February 1928 – 12 December 2013), known in Australia as George Herscu, was a Romanian-born entrepreneur best known for his retail developments in Australia and the United States.

== Biography ==
George Herscu was born in 1928 at Bucharest, the capital city of Romania. At age 10 he left school to making furniture with his father. The family were persecuted by German troops for their Jewish faith and interned at various concentration camps around Europe.

Herscu survived The Holocaust, along with his parents who emigrated to Israel. He arrived at the Bonegilla Migrant Camp in early 1950. He soon partnered with Zygmunt Singlust to open a milk bar in Yarraville. They refurbished and sold it for a profit, marking their entry into the property business.

In the late 1950s, they began building car-orientated shopping strips in Melbourne's outer suburbs with Maurice Alter. A financial dispute in 1960 led to Singlust's departure from the partnership. Herscu and Alter later resumed working together, establishing the Masaga Group together with Paul Fayman in 1964.

He was later a director of Hanover Holdings and Hooker Corporation.
