= Raymond Borg =

Maltese businessman (born 1930)

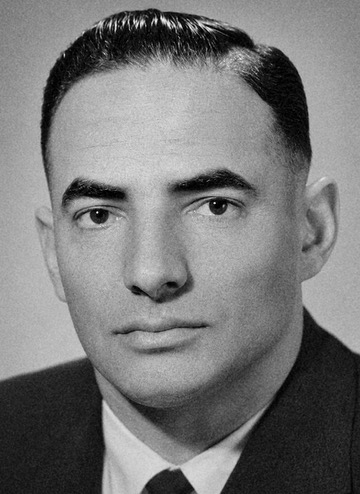
- Born: 30 October 1930; Cairo, Egypt
- Disappeared: 1993
- Monuments: Borg Crescent (Scoresby, Victoria)
- Occupation: Property developer
- Years active: 1950–93
- Board member of: Payne's Properties (1958–62); Reid Murray Group (1959–62); Adams Group (1973–93)

Raymond Lawrence Adolf Borg (born 14 October 1930) was a Maltese businessman active in Australia and Canada during the second half of the 20th Century. His career became embroiled in major corporate scandals beginning in the early 1960s. He played a key role in the downfall of Reid Murray, which lead to the largest bankruptcy in Australian history at the time. After serving prison time he fled to Toronto where he built up North America's largest medical waste incineration and transportation company.

== Biography ==
=== Early life ===
Raymond Borg was born on 14 October 1930 in Cairo, Egypt, the only child of Maltese parents Alfred Borg and Louise Borg. His father was a Suez Canal employee. Borg met his future wife at a party during his late teens and they soon emigrated to Australia with Ruby's parents. He later recalled moving to Australia because he believed it had the "brightest future" of any country.

Upon arriving at Sydney Airport in September 1949, Borg told a Daily Mirror journalist he was bound for the University of Melbourne to study law and had recently passed an entrance examination for both Oxford and Cambridge universities. Instead of pursuing a legal career, he began part-time accounting studies elsewhere while working for Victorian Railways as a clerk.

In 1952, he featured in The Herald newspaper or his bold purchase of a dilapidated terrace in Caulfield North for a price well above market value. He set about renovating the property before selling for a profit, marking the beginning of his real estate career.

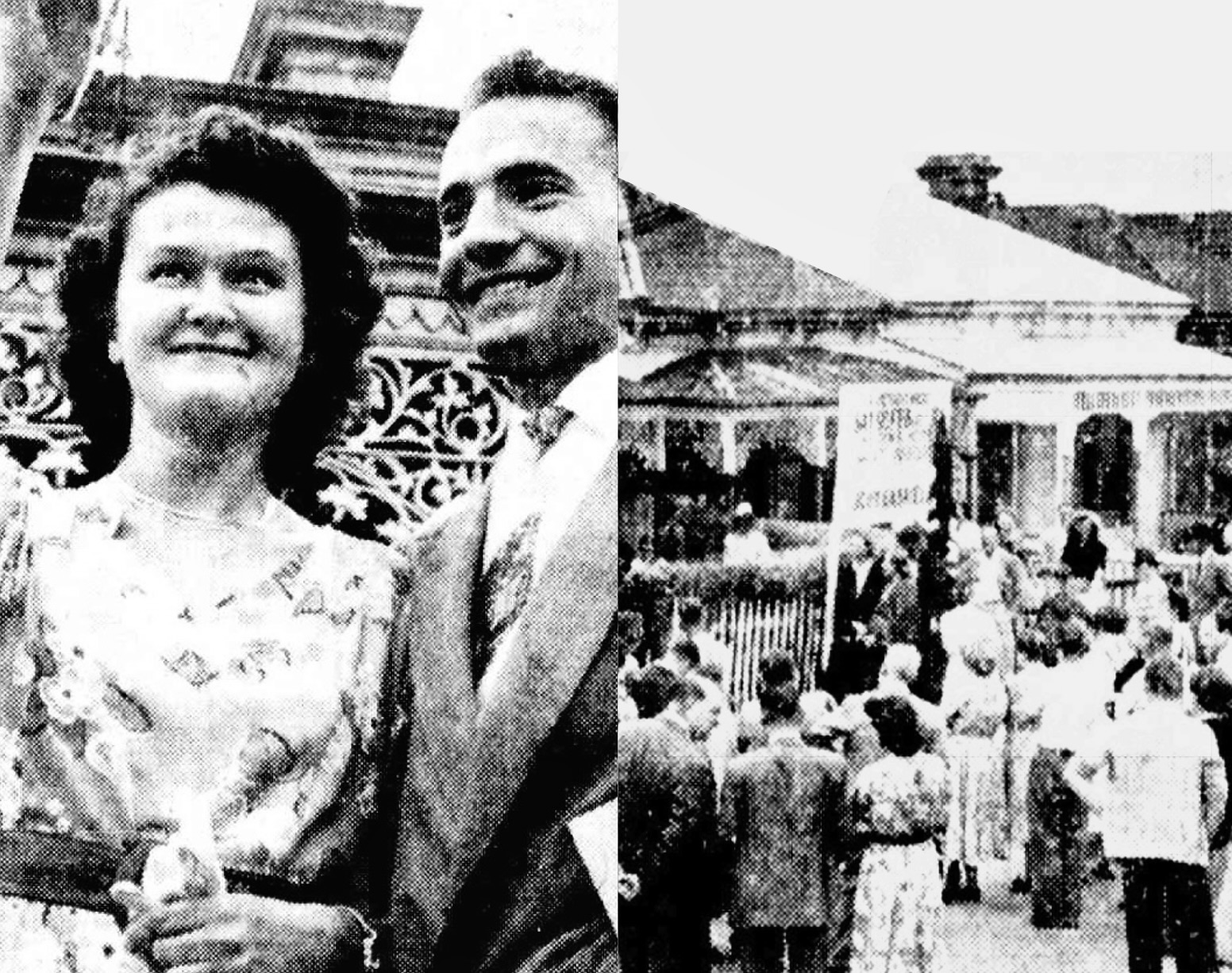
Borg and his future wife buying their first investment property in Caulfield North, 1952

After completing his accounting studies, Borg applied for a part-time cleaning position at the Paynes Bon Marché city department store but was rejected due to a lack of experience. He subsequently left Victorian Railways to work for a private insurance company, later returning to Paynes as a canvasser selling electronics and soft goods on Bourke Street. While maintaining his involvement in real estate, Borg proved highly successful in the role.

=== Paynes Properties ===
His aptitude and flair was noticed by Robert Reid, the managing director of Paynes' parent company, who took a particular interest in Borg's real estate activities. At the time, Reid was seeking diversification and opted to put Borg in charge of an experimental realestate operation. Initially carried out without formal branding, its principal objective was to build affordable homes with low or no down-payment, appealing to newly arrived migrants and young families.

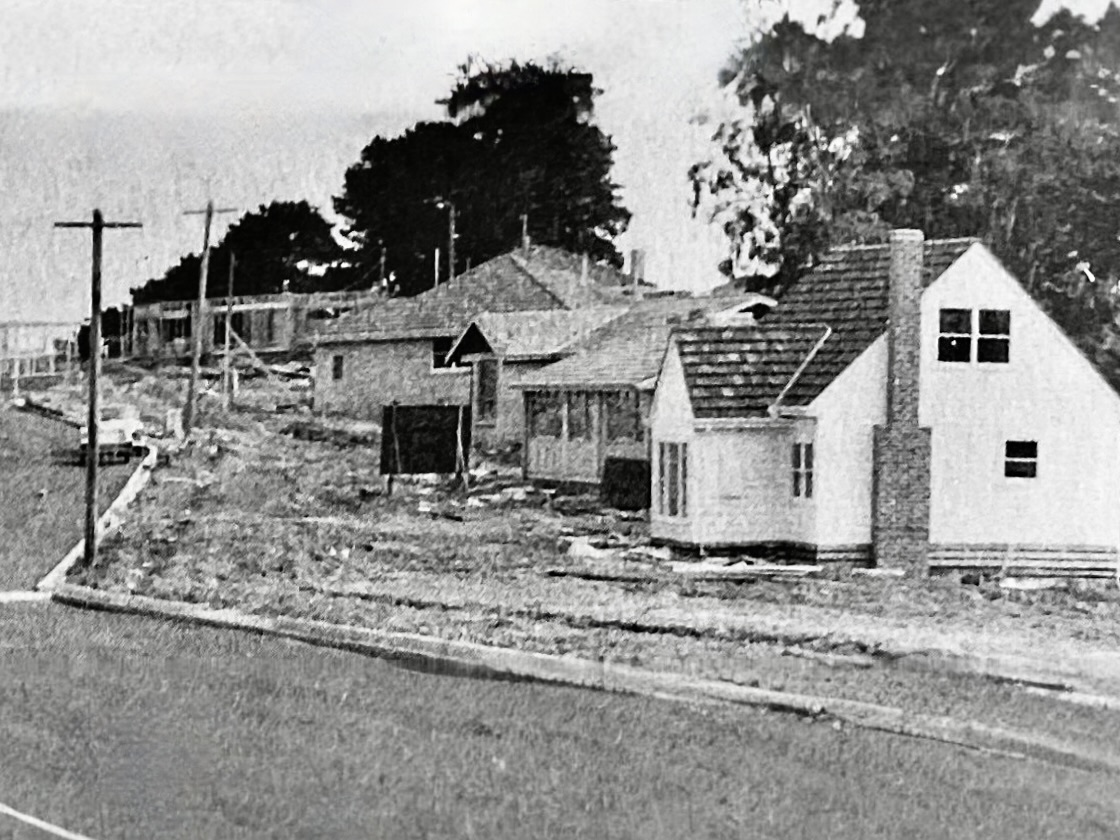
Houses built by Paynes Properties at Mahoneys Road in Forest Hill, 1959

In July 1958, Robert Reid formally founded Paynes Properties, a new subsidiary of his retail and finance conglomerate. Borg assumed the role of managing director, subsequently acquiring vast tracts of land across Melbourne for housing estates. One of his first major developments was the Louisiana Estate in Mount Waverley, which was so successful it reportedly nearly sold out all 80 blocks during the opening week.

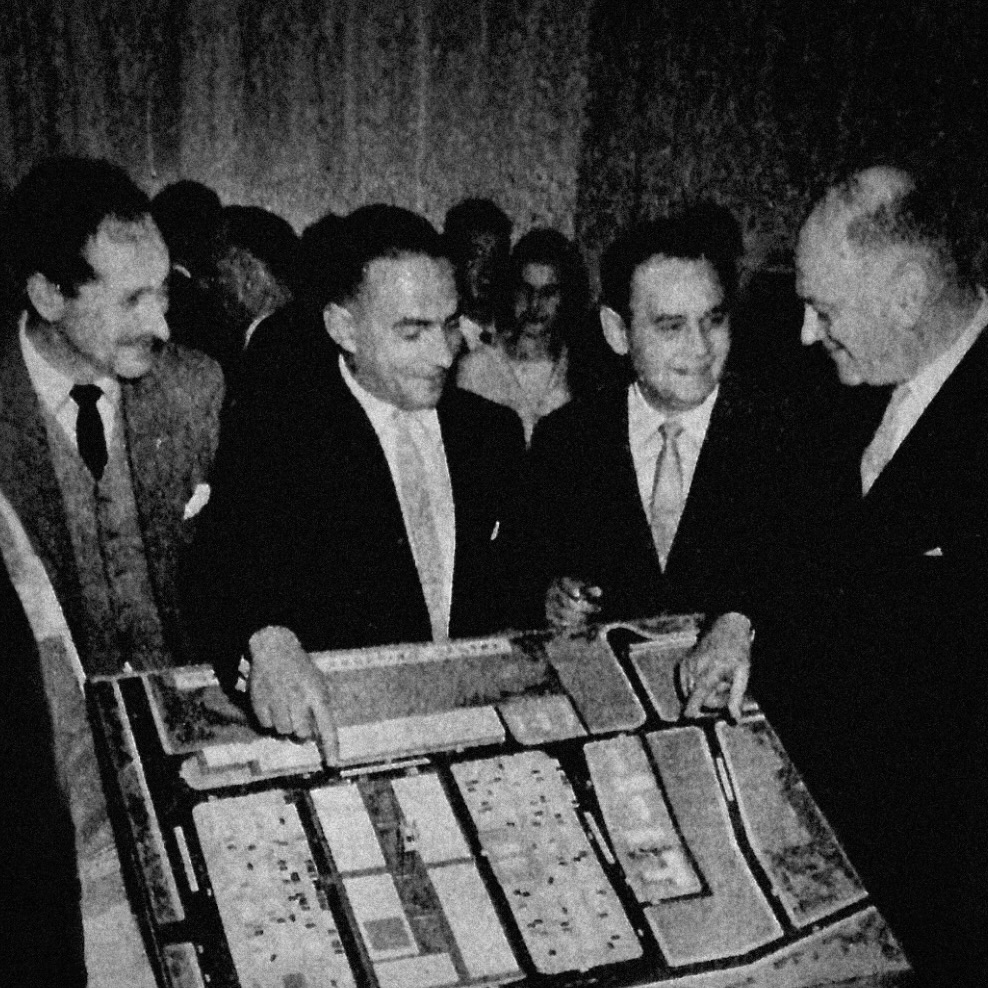
Borg (middle-left) with a model of the proposed Forest Hill Shopping Centre, 1959

Following satisfactory returns from its initial developments across suburban Melbourne, Paynes Properties shifted more attention towards a major project known in Sunbury. The proposal was formally announced at a buffet dinner held at the historic Menzies Hotel in April 1959, and was attended by several high-profile guests, including Victorian Premier Henry Bolte, who controversially described the scheme as "wonderful, bold and visionary".

The development, known as the Sunbury Satellite Town, was presented to the public through a large commissioned diorama illustrating its proposed civic and shopping centre. Plans included 10,000 homes, 40 industrial sites, six shopping centres, as well as schools, hotels, cinemas, churches, hospitals, clinics, offices, a civic centre, and recreational facilities. The town was to be built in six sections, referred to as "neighbourhoods", each designed around a central shopping area surrounded by residential housing.

Within weeks of the public announcement of the Sunbury scheme, Borg was appointed a director of Reid Murray Holdings, becoming the youngest board member of a company of that scale in Australia. At the time, Reid Murray Holdings ranked among Australia's ten largest and most influential corporations. Coinciding with his board appointment, Borg appeared at a press conference held at the Hotel Australia to announce Paynes Properties' involvement in the proposed £6 million Forest Hill Drive-In Shopping Centre, which was promoted as an ultra-modern retail development.

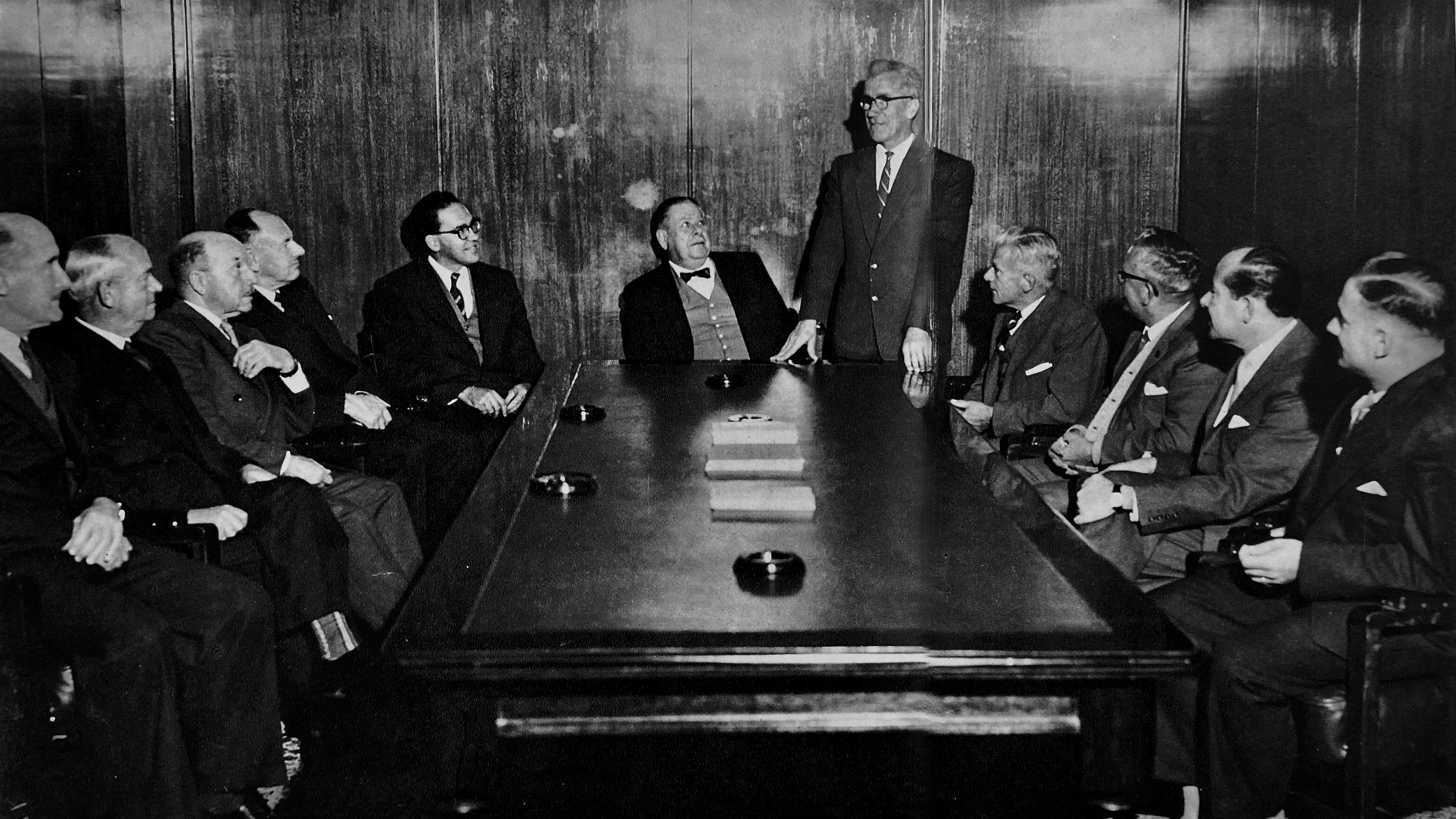
Borg (far-right) at a Reid Murray board meeting, 1959

Construction commenced later that year under a partnership with Paul Fayman and Stanley Korman; however, the half-built development collapsed with Korman's Stanhill Group in 1961. Another unsuccessful proposal from this period was Australialand, an ambitious entertainment project. Borg, Fayman and a consortium of private investors acquired extensive land holdings at Laverton with the intention of developing an Australian counterpart to Disneyland. Announced in 1960, the proposal attracted widespread media attention but was ultimately deemed financially unviable and abandoned during a government-imposed credit squeeze.

Massive flaws in the Sunbury scheme were apparent from the outset, and Paynes Properties failed to attract other developers with sufficient capital to back the project. Despite this, the company continued subdividing land at Sunbury with little success. In April 1960, Labor politician Leo Fennessy scrutinised Paynes Properties for building only "45-or-so" homes instead of the 1000 that were meant to have been completed.

The leader of the opposition Clive Stoneham told the house of representatives that the Sunbury scheme appeared to be a "swindle". Premier Bolte's earlier support for the project was criticised, leading him to deny endorsement of the project and instead claim that he had in fact discouraged Borg. This was in contrast to a tape recording supposedly in possession of Paynes Properties. Following the parliamentary attacks, public faith in the proposal began to dwindle. Then, throughout 1961, Reid Murray faced a severe liquidity crisis.

The situation worsened until December 1962, when Reid Murray's bubble burst leaving 80,000 investors in shambles. Subsequently, Labor MP William MacDonald called on a government investigation into Reid Murray, claiming that it had "dropped the greatest bomb on our investment market in 20 years". Around the same time, Borg received a writ claiming false advertising by his firm. Sunbury Developments, which had entered a contract with Paynes Properties, alleged that Borg did not intend to, or was not going to build the satellite town, and that several untrue claims had been made during the advertising campaign.

=== Reid Murray collapse ===
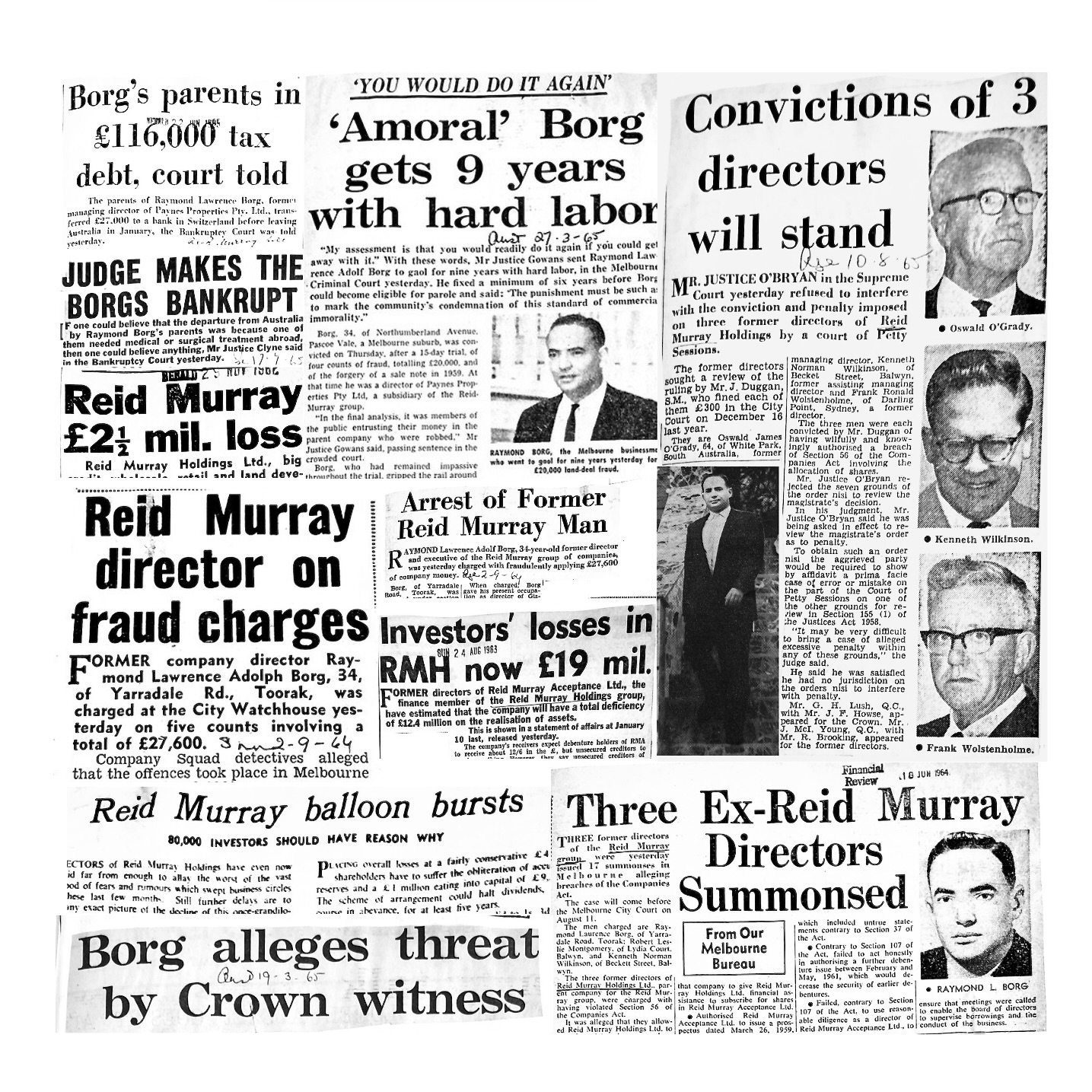
Media storm, 1960s

By mid-1963 the Reid Murray group was collapsing under a debt of some £25.8 million (equivalent to $283.5m in 2025). By this point, the Victorian Government had formally commissioned investigators to probe the Reid-Murray collapse. Their report, tabled in Parliament, bluntly accused Borg of using his control of Payne's Properties to fabricate profits and divert company funds for his family's benefit. Inspectors calculated that "Borg's interests received, in cash from Federated Pays Group, funds in excess of £70,000".

They noted a suspiciously dated sale document that had been back-dated to inflate profits, and "loan" advances to enable directors to buy company shares. In particular, auditors recorded that Payne's Properties had made unsecured loans to a private firm, whose directors and principal shareholders were revealed to be Borg and his wife. Many of these intra-group loans (over £100,000 to directors) were in breach of company law and possibly "irrecoverable".

They also found that Borg had directed "a series of dealings primarily designed to produce fictitious profits", falsifying the accounts to cover short. In one scheme, Payne's Properties paid an excessive price to acquire the Louisiana group of companies from Borg's relatives, effectively transferring about £150,000 of group assets to Borg interests with little real consideration.

The investigations led to criminal charges. In 1965 Borg went on trial in Melbourne's Supreme Court. A jury found him guilty on multiple counts: four counts of fraudulently misapplying cheques (totalling about £20,000) and one count of forging a sales agreement. A judge sentenced him to nine years' imprisonment with hard labour, specifying a minimum of six years before parole.

The court also permanently disqualified Borg from holding an estate agent's licence. He received nine-years in Melbourne's Pentridge Prison, but served a minimum sentence of five years before release. He told the Bankruptcy Court in 1966: "Being in gaol is a tremendous shock. You can survive only by forgetting the past and not thinking about the future".

While Borg served his sentence, other related matters made headlines. Press reports of the era noted financial difficulties for his family: newspapers claimed his parents had incurred a large tax assessment (about £116,000) and that their home was robbed of £9,000, leading Borg to offer a £3,000 reward for information. In one court hearing, a witness even alleged Borg had threatened to have him knifed if he testified. These accounts appeared in the contemporary press, although they were not central to the official findings.

=== Release from prison and later life ===
After his release from prison, Borg vanished from the Australian business scene. He would later re-emerged in North America under the assumed name Ray Adams. He then built a successful career in the private healthcare sector – notably by the late 1970s he was known as the owner of Decom Medical Waste Systems, which controversially operated incinerators in the both United States and Canada. A 1977 Toronto Globe and Mail investigation finally exposed his past: after a year-long probe reporters confirmed that Ray Adams was in fact Raymond Lawrence Adolf Borg. The Globe reported that Borg/Adams had immigrated to Canada in 1973 under a false identity, denying his criminal history. Following several high-profile lawsuits in the late 1980 and early '90s, Borg disappeared from the public eye once again and is believed to have fled to Tunisia.
