= Centrepoint Mall (Melbourne) =

Retail complex in Melbourne, Australia

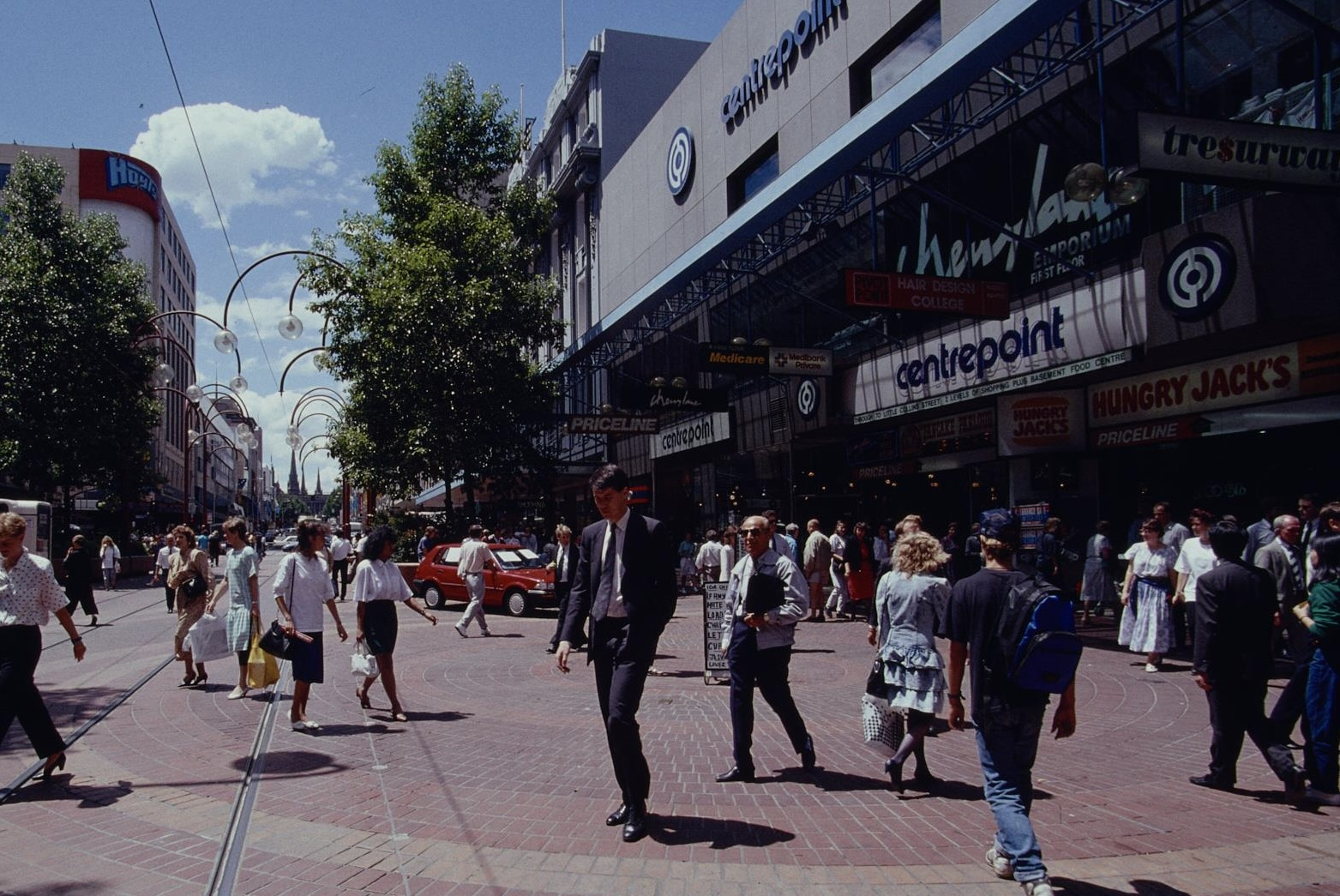
- Location: Melbourne, Victoria, Australia
- Address: 283-297 Bourke Street
- Opened: 9 October 1979
- Developer: Maurice Alter; Paul Fayman
- Owner: Centrepoint Freeholds (1979–88)
- Architect: R. Barnard-Brown & Associates (1977–80)
- Num. of stores: 100+

Centrepoint Mall is a shopping centre located in the Australian city of Melbourne, Victoria. Situated between Bourke and Little Collins Street, it opened in 1979 with over 100 tenants but now operates at a much smaller capacity, with much of its original retail and office space sitting under-utilised. It is largely considered by locals to be a dead mall. A Priceline Pharmacy store currently occupies the former second floor mall, and several smaller speciality stores continue to operate along the frontage to Bourke and Little Collins Streets.

== Preceding ==
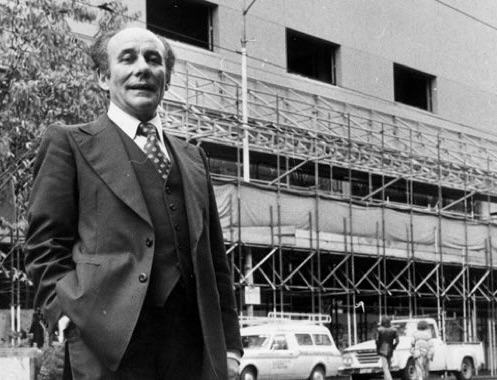
Developer Maurice Alter at Centrepoint

=== Background ===
In late 1969, retailing/insurance/hotel entrepreneur Donald Trescowthick speculatively bought a former Woolworths department store on Bourke Street, and set about converting it into a multi-storey restaurant and tavern-style bar venue. His company, Commodore Hotels, took out significant loans to open the prominent Eureka Stockade hotel on the site in 1971. The following year, Commodore were forced to sell the Stockade to property group Hanover Holdings amid a debt crisis.

Hanover purchased several neighbouring sites over the resulting year, including the Berkowitz, Union Building Society and Mason's buildings. These occupied a prominent site between Bourke and Little Collins streets, diagonally opposite the Myer Emporium, one of Melbourne's most important retail landmarks. The buildings were leased back to their previous owners for a period of five years, providing time to plan and coordinate the proposed redevelopment.

=== Development ===
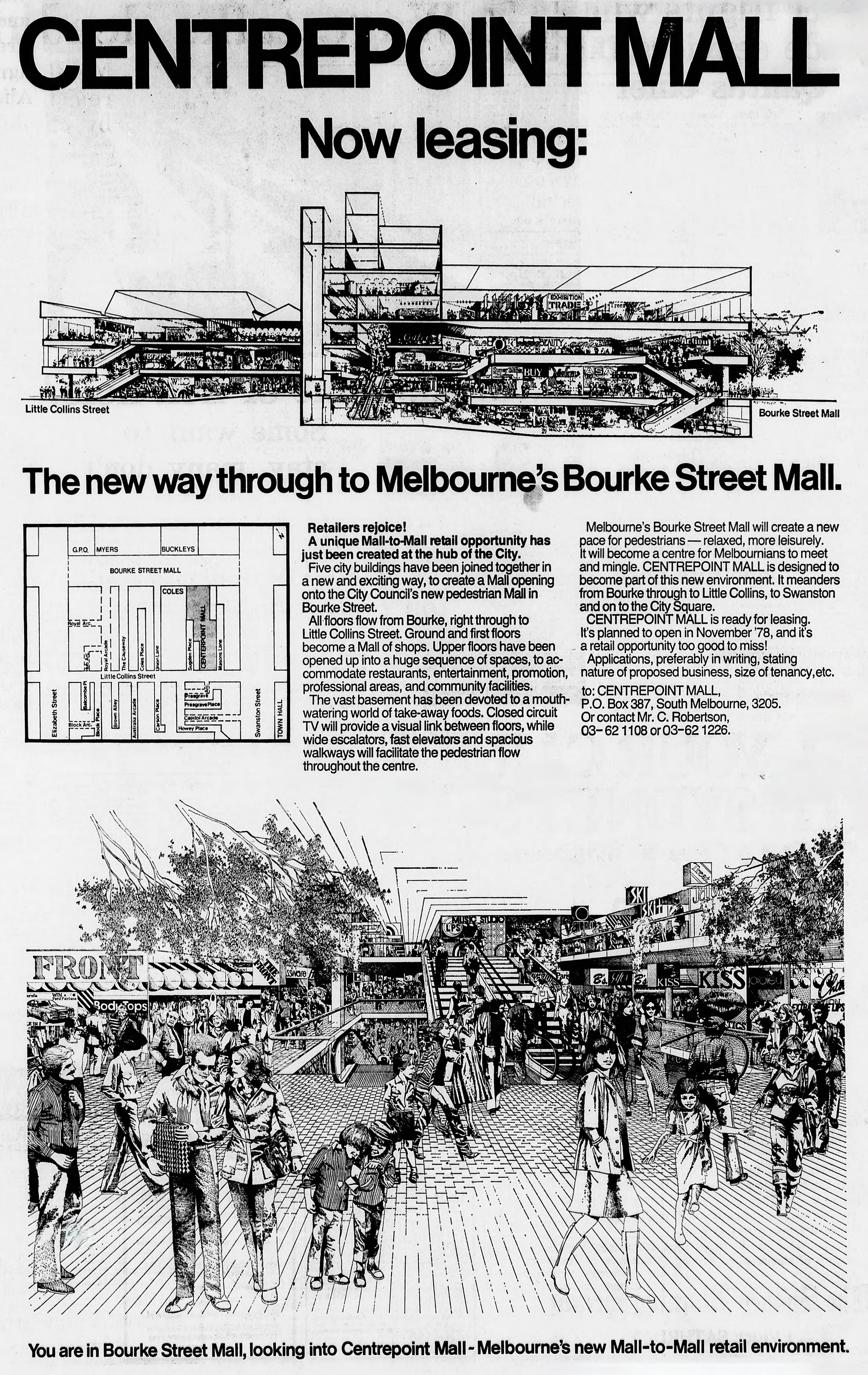
Advertisement for Centrepoint Mall

Plans for the highly-anticipated redevelopment were initiated in early 1977, when Hanover executives Maurice Alter and Paul Fayman commissioned architect Ray Barnard-Brown to design a large-scale indoor shopping centre for the site. The proposal was promoted by the Lord Mayor of Melbourne, Irvin Rockman, as the "largest and most expensive retail development in Melbourne's central business district in over half a century." Centrepoint was a big part of his Get People Back Into The City campaign.

Upon completion, Centrepoint featured over 70 retail outlets and a pedestrian arcade linking Bourke and Little Collins streets. It also had a basement-level food court, a large self-service cafeteria on the second level and several floors of specialty retail stores. Office suites and the district headquarters of Qantas and Medibank were located on the upper levels with the a beauty school and business college.

Architectural features included a prominent 10-metre illuminated sign above the Bourke Street entrance and a large chandelier suspended across three storeys. This could be raised, lowered, rotated, or dimmed to create various visual effects. In addition, an electronic billboard with over 3,000 lightbulbs was installed to broadcast advertisements and international news. A 300-seat Pancake Parlour was located in the basement food court alongside The Reject Shop.

=== Opening ===
Centrepoint Mall was officially opened on 9 October 1979 by Victorian Premier Rupert Hamer, who described the development as "a most attractive major new central business district focal point."

=== Criticism ===
The centre's reputation suffered in 1981, after a Federal Court judge found that the development company, Centrepoint Freeholds, had contravened the Trade Practises Act by engaging in misleading conduct to induce a tenant to take up shop leases in the mall. In his judgement, a justice said that the leasing brochure was misleading, claiming: "One of the more striking effects of the mall is the confusion cause by the walkways, both level and sloping, the escalators, stairs and corners. It is easy to become disoriented and confused, and it is easy to become lost as in a maze".

=== Demise and future ===
Although the shopping centre was relatively popular when it first opened, patronage declined significantly after the nearby Melbourne Central Shopping Centre opened in late 1991, followed by the opening of Emporium Melbourne in 2014. The most severe blow to Centrepoint came during the two years of pandemic lockdowns, which drove shoppers and city workers out of the CBD, leading to a sharp decline in foot traffic—the primary source of income for retailers. In 2022, Centrepoint indicated that a major overhaul of the building was being considered as a future option. As of June 2025, the Centrepoint building remains open, with Priceline Pharmacy occupying most of the original indoor mall area. The remaining areas are closed to the public.
