= Precedent =

Rule established in an earlier legal case

Precedent is a judicial decision that serves as an authority for courts when deciding subsequent identical or similar cases. Fundamental to common law legal systems, precedent operates under the principle of stare decisis ("to stand by things decided"), where past judicial decisions serve as case law to guide future rulings, thus promoting consistency and predictability.

Precedent is a defining feature that sets common law systems apart from civil law systems. In common law, precedent can either be something courts must follow (binding) or something they can consider but do not have to follow (persuasive). Civil law systems, in contrast, are characterized by comprehensive codes and detailed statutes, with little emphasis on precedent (see jurisprudence constante), and where judges primarily focus on fact-finding and applying the codified law.

Courts in common law systems rely heavily on case law, which refers to the collection of precedents and legal principles established by previous judicial decisions on specific issues or topics. The development of case law depends on the systematic publication and indexing of these decisions in law reports, making them accessible to lawyers, courts, and the general public.

Generally speaking, a legal precedent may be:

- applied (if precedent is binding) / adopted (if precedent is persuasive), if the principles underpinning the previous decision are accordingly used to evaluate the issues of the subsequent case;
- distinguished, if the principles underpinning the previous decision are found specific to, or premised upon, certain factual scenarios, and not applied to the subsequent case because of the absence of or a material difference in the latter's facts;
- modified, if the same court on determination of the same case on order from a higher court modified one or more parts of the previous decision; or
- overruled, if the same or higher courts on appeal or determination of subsequent cases found the principles underpinning the previous decision erroneous in law or overtaken by new legislation or developments.

== Principles ==
=== Stare decisis ===
Stare decisis (/ˈstɛərri dɪˈsaɪsɪs, ˈstɑːreɪ/) is a judicial doctrine under which courts follow the principles, rules, or standards established in their prior decisions (or those of higher courts) when deciding cases involving the same or closely related issues. The term originates from the Latin phrase stare decisis et non quieta movere, meaning to "stand by the thing decided and do not disturb the calm."

The doctrine operates both horizontally and vertically. Vertical stare decisis binds lower courts to strictly follow the decisions of higher courts within the same jurisdiction. The Seventh Circuit Court of Appeals applying a precedent set by the U.S. Supreme Court is an example of vertical stare decisis. Horizontal stare decisis refers the principle that a court adheres to its own previous rulings.

In the modern era, the U.S. Supreme Court adheres to its prior decisions unless there is a "special justification" to overrule precedent. By taking this approach, the Court has rejected a strict view of stare decisis that would require it to uphold past rulings regardless of their merits or the practical consequences of maintaining or overturning them.

=== Ratio decidendi and obiter dicta ===
Ratio decidendi ("the reason for the decision") refers to the key factual element or line of reasoning in a case that forms the basis for the court's final judgment. It forms the basis for a court decision and creates binding precedent. This distinguishes it from other parts of a judicial opinion, such as obiter dicta (non-binding observations or comments).

In contrast, obiter dicta ("something said in passing") refers to comments, suggestions, or observations made by a judge in an opinion that are not necessary to resolve the case at hand. While not legally binding on other courts, such statements may be cited as persuasive authority in subsequent litigation.

=== Hierarchy of courts ===
==== Federalism and parallel state and federal courts ====
In federal systems the division between federal and state law may result in complex interactions. In the United States, state courts are not considered inferior to federal courts but rather constitute a parallel court system.

- When a federal court rules on an issue of state law, the federal court must follow the precedent of the state courts, under the Erie doctrine. If an issue of state law arises during a case in federal court, and there is no decision on point from the highest court of the state, the federal court must either attempt to predict how the state courts would resolve the issue by looking at decisions from state appellate courts, or, if allowed by the constitution of the relevant state, submit the question to the state's courts.
- On the other hand, when a state court rules on an issue of federal law, the state court is bound only by rulings of the Supreme Court, but not by decisions of federal district or circuit courts of appeals. However, some states have adopted a practice of considering themselves bound by rulings of the court of appeals embracing their states, as a matter of comity rather than constitutional obligation.

In practice, however, judges in one system will almost always choose to follow relevant case law in the other system to prevent divergent results and to minimize forum shopping.

== Types of precedent ==
=== Binding precedent ===
Binding precedent, based on the legal principle of stare decisis, requires lower courts to follow the decisions of appellate courts in the same jurisdiction. In other words, when an appellate court resolves a question of law, its determination, or "holding," serves as precedent that lower courts are bound to apply in cases involving similar facts or legal issues.

For example, in the United States, decisions of the U.S. Supreme Court, as the nation's highest court, are binding on all other courts nationwide.

=== Persuasive precedent ===
Persuasive precedent refers to legal decisions that a court may consider but is not obligated to follow when deciding a case, as they are not binding. Examples include decisions from courts in neighboring jurisdictions and dicta from rulings by higher courts. For example, in Australia and Hong Kong decisions of superior overseas courts, such as those from the United Kingdom, serve as persuasive precedent.

Although not binding precedent, a court may choose to rely on persuasive precedent if the reasoning is compelling. Courts often turn to decisions from other jurisdictions for guidance, particularly when interpreting unclear laws or addressing "cases of first impression"—situations in which no prior binding authority exists and the court must determine the applicable law for the first time.

=== Nonprecedential decisions ===
Nonpublication of opinions, or unpublished opinions, are those decisions of courts that are not available for citation as precedent because the judges making the opinion deem the cases as having less precedential value. Selective publication is the legal process which a judge or justices of a court decide whether a decision is to be or not published in a reporter. "Unpublished" federal appellate decisions are published in the Federal Appendix. Depublication is the power of a court to make a previously published order or opinion unpublished.

Litigation that is settled out of court generates no written decision, thus has no precedential effect. As one practical effect, the U.S. Department of Justice settles many cases against the federal government simply to avoid creating adverse precedent.

== Precedent in civil law and mixed systems ==
=== Civil law systems ===
Stare decisis is not usually a doctrine used in civil law systems, because it violates the legislative positivist principle that only the legislature may make law. Instead, the civil law system relies on the doctrine of jurisprudence constante, according to which if a court has adjudicated a consistent line of cases that arrive at the same holdings using sound reasoning, then the previous decisions are highly persuasive but not controlling on issues of law. This doctrine is similar to stare decisis insofar as it dictates that a court's decision must condone a cohesive and predictable result. In theory, lower courts are generally not bound by the precedents of higher courts. In practice, the need for predictability means that lower courts generally defer to the precedent of higher courts. As a result, the precedent of courts of last resort, such as the French Cassation Court and the Council of State, is recognized as being de facto binding on lower courts.

The doctrine of jurisprudence constante also influences how court decisions are structured. In general, court decisions of common law jurisdictions give a sufficient ratio decidendi as to guide future courts. The ratio is used to justify a court decision on the basis of previous case law as well as to make it easier to use the decision as a precedent for future cases. By contrast, court decisions in some civil law jurisdictions (most prominently France) tend to be extremely brief, mentioning only the relevant legislation and codal provisions and not going into the ratio decidendi in any great detail. This is the result of the legislative positivist view that the court is only interpreting the legislature's intent and therefore detailed exposition is unnecessary. Because of this, ratio decidendi is carried out by legal academics (doctrinal writers) who provide the explanations that in common law jurisdictions would be provided by the judges themselves.

In other civil law jurisdictions, such as the German-speaking countries, ratio decidendi tend to be much more developed than in France, and courts will frequently cite previous cases and doctrinal writers. However, some courts (such as German courts) have less emphasis on the particular facts of the case than common law courts, but have more emphasis on the discussion of various doctrinal arguments and on finding what the correct interpretation of the law is.

The mixed systems of the Nordic countries are sometimes considered a branch of the civil law, but they are sometimes counted as separate from the civil law tradition. In Sweden, for instance, case law arguably plays a more important role than in some of the continental civil law systems. The two highest courts, the Supreme Court (Högsta domstolen) and the Supreme Administrative Court (Högsta förvaltningsdomstolen), have the right to set precedent which has persuasive authority on all future application of the law. Appellate courts, be they judicial (hovrätter) or administrative (kammarrätter), may also issue decisions that act as guides for the application of the law, but these decisions are persuasive, not controlling, and may therefore be overturned by higher courts.

=== Mixed or bijuridical systems ===
Some mixed systems, such as Scots law in Scotland, South African law, Laws of the Philippines, and the law of Quebec and Louisiana, do not fit into the civil vs. common law dichotomy because they mix portions of both. Such systems may have been heavily influenced by the common law tradition; however, their private law is firmly rooted in the civil law tradition. Because of their position between the two main systems of law, these types of legal systems are sometimes referred to as "mixed" systems of law. Louisiana courts, for instance, operate under both stare decisis and jurisprudence constante. In South Africa, the precedent of higher courts is absolutely or fully binding on lower courts, whereas the precedent of lower courts only has persuasive authority on higher courts; horizontally, precedent is prima facie or presumptively binding between courts.

=== Role of academics in civil law jurisdictions ===
Law professors in common law traditions play a much smaller role in developing case law than professors in civil law traditions. Because court decisions in civil law traditions are brief and not amenable to establishing precedent, much of the exposition of the law in civil law traditions is done by academics rather than by judges; this is called doctrine and may be published in treatises or in journals such as Recueil Dalloz in France. Historically, common law courts relied little on legal scholarship; thus, at the turn of the twentieth century, it was very rare to see an academic writer quoted in a legal decision (except perhaps for the academic writings of prominent judges such as Coke and Blackstone). Today academic writers are often cited in legal argument and decisions as persuasive authority; often, they are cited when judges are attempting to implement reasoning that other courts have not yet adopted, or when the judge believes the academic's restatement of the law is more compelling than can be found in precedent.

== Critical analysis ==
=== Court formulations ===
Justice Louis Brandeis, in a heavily footnoted dissent to Burnet v. Coronado Oil & Gas Co., 285 U.S. 393, 405–411 (1932), explained (citations and quotations omitted):

Stare decisis is not ... a universal, inexorable command. "The rule of stare decisis, though one tending to consistency and uniformity of decision, is not inflexible. Whether it shall be followed or departed from is a question entirely within the discretion of the court, which is again called upon to consider a question once decided." Stare decisis is usually the wise policy, because in most matters it is more important that the applicable rule of law be settled than that it be settled right. This is commonly true even where the error is a matter of serious concern, provided correction can be had by legislation. But in cases involving the Federal Constitution, where correction through legislative action is practically impossible, this Court has often overruled its earlier decisions. The Court bows to the lessons of experience and the force of better reasoning, recognizing that the process of trial and error, so fruitful in the physical sciences, is appropriate also in the judicial function. ... In cases involving the Federal Constitution the position of this Court is unlike that of the highest court of England, where the policy of stare decisis was formulated and is strictly applied to all classes of cases. Parliament is free to correct any judicial error; and the remedy may be promptly invoked. The reasons why this Court should refuse to follow an earlier constitutional decision which it deems erroneous are particularly strong where the question presented is one of applying, as distinguished from what may accurately be called interpreting, the Constitution. In the cases which now come before us there is seldom any dispute as to the interpretation of any provision. The controversy is usually over the application to existing conditions of some well-recognized constitutional limitation. This is strikingly true of cases under the due process clause when the question is whether a statute is unreasonable, arbitrary or capricious; of cases under the equal protection clause when the question is whether there is any reasonable basis for the classification made by a statute; and of cases under the commerce clause when the question is whether an admitted burden laid by a statute upon interstate commerce is so substantial as to be deemed direct. ...

In his "landmark dissent" in Burnet, Brandeis "catalogued the Court's actual overruling practices in such a powerful manner that his attendant stare decisis analysis immediately assumed canonical authority."

The United States Court of Appeals for the Third Circuit has stated:

A judicial precedent attaches a specific legal consequence to a detailed set of facts in an adjudged case or judicial decision, which is then considered as furnishing the rule for the determination of a subsequent case involving identical or similar material facts and arising in the same court or a lower court in the judicial hierarchy.

The United States Court of Appeals for the Ninth Circuit has stated:

Stare decisis is the policy of the court to stand by precedent; the term is but an abbreviation of stare decisis et non quieta movere—"to stand by and adhere to decisions and not disturb what is settled". Consider the word "decisis". The word means, literally and legally, the decision. Under the doctrine of stare decisis a case is important only for what it decides—for the "what", not for the "why", and not for the "how". Insofar as precedent is concerned, stare decisis is important only for the decision, for the detailed legal consequence following a detailed set of facts.

Lord Hodge of the UK Supreme Court quoted Lord Wright in 1938 saying:

[T]hat is the way of the common law, the judges preferring to go from case to case, like the ancient Mediterranean mariners, hugging the coast from point to point, and avoiding the dangers of the open sea of system or science.

=== Academic study ===
Precedent viewed against passing time can serve to establish trends, thus indicating the next logical step in evolving interpretations of the law. For instance, if immigration has become more and more restricted under the law, then the next legal decision on that subject may serve to restrict it further still. The existence of submerged precedent (reasoned opinions not made available through conventional legal research sources) has been identified as a potentially distorting force in the evolution of law.

Scholars have recently attempted to apply network theory to precedent in order to establish which precedent is most important or authoritative, and how the court's interpretations and priorities have changed over time.

== Application ==
=== Development ===
Early English common law did not have or require the stare decisis doctrine for a range of legal and technological reasons:

- During the formative period of the common law, the royal courts constituted only one among many fora in which in the English could settle their disputes. The royal courts operated alongside and in competition with ecclesiastic, manorial, urban, mercantile, and local courts.
- Royal courts were not organised into a hierarchy; instead, different royal courts (exchequer, common pleas, king's bench, and chancery) were in competition with each other.
- Substantial law on almost all matters was neither legislated nor codified, eliminating the need for courts to interpret legislation.
- Common law's main distinctive features and focus were not substantial law, which was customary law, but procedural.
- The practice of citing previous cases was not to find binding legal rules but as evidence of custom.
- Customary law was not a rational and consistent body of rules and did not require a system of binding precedent.
- Before the printing press, the state of the written records of cases rendered the stare decisis doctrine utterly impracticable.

These features changed over time, opening the door to the doctrine of stare decisis:

By the end of the eighteenth century, the common law courts had absorbed most of the business of their nonroyal competitors, although there was still internal competition among the different common law courts themselves. During the nineteenth century, legal reform movements in both England and the United States brought this to an end as well by merging the various common law courts into a unified system of courts with a formal hierarchical structure. This and the advent of reliable private case reporters made adherence to the doctrine of stare decisis practical and the practice soon evolved of holding judges to be bound by the decisions of courts of superior or equal status in their jurisdiction.

=== United States legal system ===
Over time courts in the United States and especially its Supreme Court developed a large body of judicial decisions which are called "precedents". These "[r]ules and principles established in prior cases inform the Court's future decisions." The adherence to rules and principles created in past cases as a foundation for future decisions by the courts is called stare decisis. The United States Supreme Court considers stare decisis not only as an important doctrine, but also "the means by which we ensure that the law will not merely change erratically, but will develop in a principled and intelligible fashion." Stare decisis aims to bolster the legitimacy of the judicial process and foster the rule of law. It does so by strengthening stability, certainty, predictability, consistency and uniformity in the application of the law to cases and litigants. By adhering to stare decisis the Supreme Court attempts to preserve its role "as a careful, unbiased, and predictable decisionmaker that decides cases according to the law rather than the Justices' individual policy preferences." In Vasquez v. Hillery (1986) the Supreme Court stated succinctly that stare decisis "contributes to the integrity of our constitutional system of government, both in appearance and in fact" by maintaining the notion "that bedrock principles are founded in the law, rather than in the proclivities of individuals."

Stare decisis reduces the number and scope of legal questions that the court must resolve in litigation. It is therefore a time saver for judges and litigants. Once a court has settled a particular question of law it has established a precedent. Thanks to stare decisis lawsuits can be quickly and efficiently dismissed because legal battles can be resolved through recourse to rules and principles established prior decisions. Stare decisis can thus encourage parties to settle cases out of court and thereby enhance judicial efficiency.

Several Supreme Court decisions were overruled by subsequent decisions since 1798. In doing so the Supreme Court has time and time again made several statements regarding stare decisis. The following is a non-exhaustive list of examples of these statements:

- Citizens United v. FEC, 558 U.S. 310, at 378 (2010) (Roberts, J., concurring): "[Stare decisis'] greatest purpose is to serve a constitutional ideal—the rule of law. It follows that in the unusual circumstance when fidelity to any particular precedent does more damage to this constitutional ideal than to advance it, we must be more willing to depart from that precedent." (citations omitted)
- Planned Parenthood of Se. Pa. v. Casey, 505 U.S. 833, at 854 (1992): "[T]he very concept of the rule of law underlying our own Constitution requires such continuity over time that a respect for precedent is, by definition, indispensable." (citations omitted)
- Alleyne v. United States, 570 U.S. 99, 118 (2013) (Sotomayor, J., concurring): "We generally adhere to our prior decisions, even if we questions their soundness, because doing so 'promotes the evenhanded, predictable, and consistent development of legal principles, fosters reliance on judicial decisions, and contributes to the actual and perceived integrity of the judicial process'."
- Hilton v. South Carolina Public. Railway Commission, 502 U.S. 197, at 202 (1991): "Adherence to precedent promotes stability, predictability, and respect for judicial authority."
- Payne v. Tennessee, 501 U.S. 808, at 827 (1991): "Stare decisis is the preferred course because it promotes the evenhanded, predictable, and consistent development of legal principles, fosters reliance on judicial decisions, and contributes to the actual and perceived integrity of the judicial process."
- Vasquez v. Hillery, 474 U.S. 254, at 265-66 (1986): "[T]he important doctrine of stare decisis [is] the means by which we ensure that the law will not merely change erratically, but will develop in a principled and intelligible fashion. That doctrine permits society to presume that bedrock principles are founded in the law, rather than in the proclivities of individuals, and thereby contributes to the integrity of our constitutional system of government, both in appearance and in fact."
- Taylor v. Sturgell, 553 U.S. 880, at 903 (2008): "[S]tare decisis will allow courts swiftly to dispose of repetitive suits ..."
- Payne v. Tennessee, 501 U.S. 808, at 834 (1991) (Scalia, J., concurring): "What would enshrine power as the governing principle of this Court is the notion that an important constitutional decision with plainly inadequate rational support must be left in place for the sole reason that it once attracted a [majority of the Court]."
- Patterson v. McLean Credit Union, 491 U.S. 164, at 172 (1989): "Our precedents are not sacrosanct, for we have overruled prior decisions where the necessity and propriety of doing so has been established."
- Smith v. Allwright, 321 U.S. 649, at 665 (1944): "[W]hen convinced of former error, this Court has never felt constrained to follow precedents. In constitutional questions, where correction depends upon amendment and not upon legislative action this Court throughout its history has freely exercised its power to reexamine the basis of its constitutional decisions."
- Janus v. Am. Fed. of State, County, & Mun. Employees, 585 U.S. ___, No. 16-1466, slip op. at 34 (2018): "We will not overturn a past decision unless there are strong grounds for doing so."
- Planned Parenthood of Se. Pa. v. Casey, 505 U.S. 833, at 864 (1992) (plurality opinion): "[A] decision to overrule should rest on some special reason over and above the belief that a prior case was wrongly decided." The plurality opinion in Casey stated also that reexamining precedent requires more than "a present doctrinal disposition to come out differently".
- Arizona v. Rumsey, 467 U.S. 203, at 212 (1984): "Although adherence to precedent is not rigidly required in constitutional cases, any departure from the doctrine of stare decisis demands special justification."

Stare decisis applies to the holding of a case, rather than to obiter dicta ("things said by the way"). As the United States Supreme Court has put it: "dicta may be followed if sufficiently persuasive but are not binding".

In the U.S. Supreme Court, the principle of stare decisis is most flexible in constitutional cases, as observed by Justice Brandeis in his landmark dissent in Burnet (as quoted at length above). For example, in the years 1946–1992, the U.S. Supreme Court reversed itself in about 130 cases. The U.S. Supreme Court has further explained as follows:

[W]hen convinced of former error, this Court has never felt constrained to follow precedent. In constitutional questions, where correction depends upon amendment, and not upon legislative action, this Court throughout its history has freely exercised its power to reexamine the basis of its constitutional decisions.

— Smith v. Allwright, 321 U.S. 649, 665 (1944)(Reed, S.F.).

The Court has stated that where a court gives multiple reasons for a given result, each alternative reason that is "explicitly" labeled by the court as an "independent" ground for the decision is not treated as "simply a dictum".

As Colin Starger has pointed out, the contemporary rule of stare decisis descended from Brandeis's landmark dissent in Burnet would later split into strong and weak conceptions as a result of the disagreement between Chief Justice William Rehnquist and Associate Justice Thurgood Marshall in Payne v. Tennessee (1991). The strong conception requires a "special justification" to overrule challenged precedent beyond the fact the precedent was "wrongly decided", while the weak conception holds that a precedent can be overruled if it suffers from "bad reasoning".

The opinion of Chief Justice John Roberts in the case June Medical Services, LLC v. Russo provides a clear statement of the strong conception of stare decisis. In this case, the Court upheld, by a 5–4 margin, their 2016 decision in Whole Woman's Health v. Hellerstedt that struck down a similar Texas law requiring doctors who perform abortions to have the right to admit patients at a nearby hospital. Roberts wrote, "The legal doctrine of stare decisis requires us, absent special circumstances, to treat like cases alike." Roberts provided the fifth vote to uphold the 2016 decision, even though he felt it was wrongly decided.

=== English legal system ===
The doctrine of binding precedent or stare decisis is basic to the English legal system. Special features of the English legal system include the following:

==== The Supreme Court's ability to override its own precedent ====
The British House of Lords, as the court of last appeal outside Scotland before it was replaced by the UK Supreme Court, was not strictly bound to always follow its own decisions until the case London Street Tramways v London County Council [1898] AC 375. After this case, once the Lords had given a ruling on a point of law, the matter was closed unless and until Parliament made a change by statute. This is the most strict form of the doctrine of stare decisis (one not previously applied in common law jurisdictions, where there was somewhat greater flexibility for a court of last resort to review its own precedent).

This situation changed, however, after the House of Lords issued the Practice Statement of 1966. The House of Lords decided to allow itself to adapt English law to meet changing social conditions. In R v G [2003] UKHL 50, the House of Lords overruled its 1981 decision in R v Caldwell, which had allowed the Lords to establish mens rea ("guilty mind") by measuring a defendant's conduct against that of a "reasonable person", regardless of the defendant's actual state of mind.

However, the Practice Statement was seldom applied by the House of Lords, usually only as a last resort. Up to 2005, the House of Lords rejected its past decisions no more than 20 times. They were reluctant to use it because they feared to introduce uncertainty into the law. In particular, the Practice Statement stated that the Lords would be especially reluctant to overrule themselves in criminal cases because of the importance of certainty of that law. The first case involving criminal law to be overruled with the Practice Statement was Anderton v Ryan (1985), which was overruled by R v Shivpuri (1986), two decades after the Practice Statement. Remarkably, the precedent overruled had been made only a year before, but it had been criticised by several academic lawyers. As a result, Lord Bridge stated he was "undeterred by the consideration that the decision in Anderton v Ryan was so recent. The Practice Statement is an effective abandonment of our pretension to infallibility. If a serious error embodied in a decision of this House has distorted the law, the sooner it is corrected the better." Still, the House of Lords has remained reluctant to overrule itself in some cases; in R v Kansal (2002), the majority of House members adopted the opinion that R v Lambert had been wrongly decided and agreed to depart from their earlier decision.

==== Distinguishing precedent on legal (rather than fact) grounds ====
A precedent does not bind a court if it finds there was a lack of care in the original (per incuriam). The Court of Appeal recognised this as an exception to stare decisis in Young v Bristol Aeroplane Co Ltd. For example, if a statutory provision or precedent had not been brought to the previous court's attention before its decision, courts may treat the precedent as not binding. There has been some judicial dispute as to the content and applicability of this doctrine.

In the Court of Appeal case of Duke v Reliance Systems Ltd, Sir John Donaldson MR stated the doctrine as follows:

I have always understood that the doctrine of per incuriam only applies where another division of this court has reached a decision in the absence of knowledge of a decision binding upon it or a statute, and that in either case it has to be shown that, had the court had this material, it must have reached a contrary decision. That is per incuriam. I do not understand the doctrine to extend to a case where, if different arguments had been placed before it or if different material had been placed before it, it might have reached a different conclusion.

In Simpson v R, the Court of Appeal preferred a definition from Bennion on Statutory Interpretation:

The basis of the per incuriam doctrine is that a decision given in the absence of relevant information cannot be safely relied on. This applies whenever it is at least probable that if information had been known the decision would have been affected by it.

==== Binding obiter dicta ====
As of R v Barton and Booth according to the Court of Appeal, the Supreme Court has the apparent ability to issue binding precedent through otherwise non-binding obiter dicta. This may only occur when, in deciding another matter, the Supreme Court directs that otherwise binding precedent should no longer be followed and proposes new authority, albeit the proposal is obiter. The existence of binding obiter, the soundness of the proposition that the Supreme Court did so alter the rules of precedent, and the soundness of the proposition that the Supreme Court could so alter the rules of precedent without first addressing how and why it is doing so have all been subject to academic criticism.

== Rules of statutory interpretation ==
One of the most important roles of precedent is to resolve ambiguities in other legal texts, such as constitutions, statutes, and regulations. The process involves, first and foremost, consultation of the plain language of the text, as enlightened by the legislative history of enactment, subsequent precedent, and experience with various interpretations of similar texts.

=== Statutory interpretation in the UK ===
A judge's normal aids include access to all previous cases in which a precedent has been set, and a good English dictionary.

Judges and barristers in the UK use three primary rules for interpreting the law.

Under the literal rule, the judge should do what the actual legislation states rather than trying to do what the judge thinks that it means. The judge should use the plain everyday ordinary meaning of the words, even if this produces an unjust or undesirable outcome. A good example of problems with this method is R v Maginnis (1987), in which several judges in separate opinions found several different dictionary meanings of the word supply. Another example is Fisher v Bell, where it was held that a shopkeeper who placed an illegal item in a shop window with a price tag did not make an offer to sell it, because of the specific meaning of "offer for sale" in contract law, merely an invitation to treat. As a result of this case, Parliament amended the statute concerned to end this discrepancy.

The golden rule is used when use of the literal rule would obviously create an absurd result. There are two ways in which the golden rule can be applied: a narrow method, and a broad method. Under the narrow method, when there are apparently two contradictory meanings to the wording of a legislative provision, or the wording is ambiguous, the least absurd is to be preferred. Under the broad method, the court modifies the literal meaning in such a way as to avoid the absurd result. An example of the latter approach is Adler v George (1964). Under the Official Secrets Act 1920 it was an offence to obstruct HM Forces "in the vicinity of" a prohibited place. Adler argued that he was not in the vicinity of such a place but was actually in it. The court chose not to read the statutory wording in a literal sense to avoid what would otherwise be an absurd result, and Adler was convicted.

The mischief rule is the most flexible of the interpretation methods. Stemming from Heydon's Case (1584), it allows the court to enforce what the statute is intended to remedy rather than what the words actually say. For example, in Corkery v Carpenter (1950), a man was found guilty of being drunk in charge of a carriage, although in fact he only had a bicycle. The final rule; although will no longer be used after the UK fully transitions out of the European Union. Known as the Purposive approach- this considers the intention of the European Court of Justice when the act was passed.

=== Statutory interpretation in the United States ===
In the United States, the courts have stated consistently that the text of the statute is read as it is written, using the ordinary meaning of the words of the statute.

- "[I]n interpreting a statute a court should always turn to one cardinal canon before all others. ... [C]ourts must presume that a legislature says in a statute what it means and means in a statute what it says there." Connecticut Nat'l Bank v. Germain, 112 S. Ct. 1146, 1149 (1992). Indeed, "[w]hen the words of a statute are unambiguous, then, this first canon is also the last: 'judicial inquiry is complete.' "
- "A fundamental rule of statutory construction requires that every part of a statute be presumed to have some effect, and not be treated as meaningless unless absolutely necessary." Raven Coal Corp. v. Absher, 153 Va. 332, 149 S.E. 541 (1929).
- "In assessing statutory language, unless words have acquired a peculiar meaning, by virtue of statutory definition or judicial construction, they are to be construed in accordance with their common usage." Muller v. BP Exploration (Alaska) Inc., 923 P.2d 783, 787–88 (Alaska 1996).

However, most legal texts have some lingering ambiguity—inevitably, situations arise in which the words chosen by the legislature do not address the precise facts in issue, or there is some tension among two or more statutes. In such cases, a court must analyze the various available sources, and reach a resolution of the ambiguity. The "Canons of statutory construction" are discussed in a separate article. Once the ambiguity is resolved, that resolution has binding effect as described in the rest of this article.

== Practical application ==
Although inferior courts are bound in theory by superior court precedent, in practice a judge may believe that justice requires an outcome at some variance with precedent, and may distinguish the facts of the individual case on reasoning that does not appear in the binding precedent. On appeal, the appellate court may either adopt the new reasoning, or reverse on the basis of precedent. On the other hand, if the losing party does not appeal (typically because of the cost of the appeal), the lower court decision may remain in effect, at least as to the individual parties.

=== Judicial resistance ===
Occasionally, lower court judges may explicitly state a personal disagreement with the rendered judgment, but are required to rule a particular way because of binding precedent. Inferior courts cannot evade binding precedent of superior courts, but a court can depart from its own prior decisions.

=== Structural considerations ===
In the United States, stare decisis can interact in counterintuitive ways with the federal and state court systems. On an issue of federal law, a state court is not bound by an interpretation of federal law at the district or circuit level, but is bound by an interpretation by the United States Supreme Court. On an interpretation of state law, whether common law or statutory law, the federal courts are bound by the interpretation of a state court of last resort, and are required normally to defer to the precedent of intermediate state courts as well.

Courts may choose to obey precedent of international jurisdictions, but this is not an application of the doctrine of stare decisis, because foreign decisions are not binding. Rather, a foreign decision that is obeyed on the basis of the soundness of its reasoning will be called persuasive authority—indicating that its effect is limited to the persuasiveness of the reasons it provides.

=== Originalism ===
Originalism is an approach to interpretation of a legal text in which controlling weight is given to the intent of the original authors (at least the intent as inferred by a modern judge). In contrast, a non-originalist looks at other cues to meaning, including the current meaning of the words, the pattern and trend of other judicial decisions, changing context and improved scientific understanding, observation of practical outcomes and "what works", contemporary standards of justice, and stare decisis. Both are directed at interpreting the text, not changing it—interpretation is the process of resolving ambiguity and choosing from among possible meanings, not changing the text.

The two approaches look at different sets of underlying facts that may or may not point in the same direction—stare decisis gives most weight to the newest understanding of a legal text, while originalism gives most weight to the oldest. While they do not necessarily reach different results in every case, the two approaches are in direct tension. Originalists such as Justice Antonin Scalia argue that "Stare decisis is not usually a doctrine used in civil law systems, because it violates the principle that only the legislature may make law." Justice Scalia argues that America is a civil law nation, not a common law nation. By principle, originalists are generally unwilling to defer to precedent when precedent seems to come into conflict with the originalist's own interpretation of the Constitutional text or inferences of original intent (even in situations where there is no original source statement of that original intent). However, there is still room within an originalist paradigm for stare decisis; whenever the plain meaning of the text has alternative constructions, past precedent is generally considered a valid guide, with the qualifier being that it cannot change what the text actually says.

Originalists vary in the degree to which they defer to precedent. In his confirmation hearings, Justice Clarence Thomas answered a question from Senator Strom Thurmond, qualifying his willingness to change precedent in this way:

I think overruling a case or reconsidering a case is a very serious matter. Certainly, you would have to be of the view that a case is incorrectly decided, but I think even that is not adequate. There are some cases that you may not agree with that should not be overruled. Stare decisis provides continuity to our system, it provides predictability, and in our process of case-by-case decision-making, I think it is a very important and critical concept. A judge that wants to reconsider a case and certainly one who wants to overrule a case has the burden of demonstrating that not only is the case incorrect, but that it would be appropriate, in view of stare decisis, to make that additional step of overruling that case.

—

Possibly he has changed his mind, or there are a very large body of cases which merit "the additional step" of ignoring the doctrine; according to Scalia, "Clarence Thomas doesn't believe in stare decisis, period. If a constitutional line of authority is wrong, he would say, let's get it right."

Caleb Nelson, a former clerk for Justice Thomas and law professor at the University of Virginia, has elaborated on the role of stare decisis in originalist jurisprudence:

American courts of last resort recognize a rebuttable presumption against overruling their own past decisions. In earlier eras, people often suggested that this presumption did not apply if the past decision, in the view of the court's current members, was demonstrably erroneous. But when the Supreme Court makes similar noises today, it is roundly criticized. At least within the academy, conventional wisdom now maintains that a purported demonstration of error is not enough to justify overruling a past decision. ... [T]he conventional wisdom is wrong to suggest that any coherent doctrine of stare decisis must include a presumption against overruling precedent that the current court deems demonstrably erroneous. The doctrine of stare decisis would indeed be no doctrine at all if courts were free to overrule a past decision simply because they would have reached a different decision as an original matter. But when a court says that a past decision is demonstrably erroneous, it is saying not only that it would have reached a different decision as an original matter, but also that the prior court went beyond the range of indeterminacy created by the relevant source of law. ... Americans from the Founding on believed that court decisions could help "liquidate" or settle the meaning of ambiguous provisions of written law. Later courts generally were supposed to abide by such "liquidations". ... To the extent that the underlying legal provision was determinate, however, courts were not thought to be similarly bound by precedent that misinterpreted it. ... Of the Court's current members, Justices Scalia and Thomas seem to have the most faith in the determinacy of the legal texts that come before the Court. It should come as no surprise that they also seem the most willing to overrule the Court's past decisions. ... Prominent journalists and other commentators suggest that there is some contradiction between these Justices' mantra of "judicial restraint" and any systematic re-examination of precedent. But if one believes in the determinacy of the underlying legal texts, one need not define "judicial restraint" solely in terms of fidelity to precedent; one can also speak of fidelity to the texts themselves.

=== Criticism of precedent ===
One of the most prominent critics of the development of legal precedent on a case-by-case basis as both overly reactive and unfairly retroactive was philosopher Jeremy Bentham. He famously attacked the common law as "dog law":

When your dog does anything you want to break him of, you wait till he does it, and then beat him for it. This is the way you make laws for your dog: and this is the way the judges make law for you and me.

In a 1997 book, attorney Michael Trotter blamed overreliance by American lawyers on precedent — especially persuasive authority of marginal relevance — rather than the merits of the case at hand, as a major factor behind the escalation of legal costs during the 20th century. He argued that courts should ban the citation of persuasive authority from outside their jurisdiction and force lawyers and parties to argue only from binding precedent, subject to two exceptions:

1. cases where the foreign jurisdiction's law is the subject of the case, or
2. instances where a litigant intends to ask the highest court of the jurisdiction to overturn binding precedent, and therefore needs to cite persuasive precedent to demonstrate a countervailing trend in other jurisdictions.

The disadvantages of stare decisis include its rigidity, the complexity of learning law, the fact that differences between certain cases may be very small and thereby appear illogical and arbitrary, and the slow growth or incremental changes to the law that are in need of major overhaul.

An argument often leveled against precedent is that it is undemocratic because it allows judges, who may or may not be elected, to make law.

=== Agreement with precedent ===
A counter-argument (in favor of the advantages of stare decisis) is that if the legislature wishes to alter the case law (other than constitutional interpretations) by statute, the legislature is empowered to do so. Critics sometimes accuse particular judges of applying the doctrine selectively, invoking it to support precedent that the judge supported anyway, but ignoring it in order to change precedent with which the judge disagreed.

There is much discussion about the virtue of using stare decisis. Supporters of the system, such as minimalists, argue that obeying precedent makes decisions "predictable". For example, a business person can be reasonably assured of predicting a decision where the facts of his or her case are sufficiently similar to a case decided previously. This parallels the arguments against retroactive (ex post facto) laws banned by the U.S. Constitution .

== See also ==
- Case citation
- Commanding precedent
- Customary law
- Distinguishing a case
- Law of Citations (Roman concept)
- Legal opinion
- List of landmark court decisions in the United States
- List of overruled United States Supreme Court decisions
- Memorandum opinion
- Precedent book
- Qiyas
- Ratio decidendi
- Taqlid
