= Textualism =

Constitutional doctrine

Textualism is a formalist theory in which the interpretation of the text is based primarily on the ordinary meaning of the legal text at the time of its enactment, where little consideration is given to non-textual sources, such as the intention of the law when passed, the problem it was intended to remedy, or questions regarding the justice or rectitude of the law.

== Definition ==
The textualist will "look at the statutory structure and hear the words as they would sound in the mind of a skilled, objectively reasonable user of words." The textualist thus does not give weight to legislative history materials when attempting to ascertain the meaning of a text. Textualism is often erroneously conflated with originalism, and was advocated by United States Supreme Court Justices such as Hugo Black and Antonin Scalia; the latter staked out his claim in his 1997 Tanner Lecture: "[it] is the law that governs, not the intent of the lawgiver." Oliver Wendell Holmes Jr., although not a textualist himself, well-captured this philosophy, and its rejection of intentionalism: "We ask, not what this man meant, but what those words would mean in the mouth of a normal speaker of English, using them in the circumstances in which they were used ... We do not inquire what the legislature meant; we ask only what the statutes mean." The magazine Washington Monthly described the difference between textualism and originalism at the end of December 2023 in this way with respect to the United States Supreme Court: "The Court’s conservative majority says it adheres to the doctrinal trail of the late Justice Antonin Scalia, who was a textualist (What are the words used by the framers?) and an originalist (What was society’s original understanding then as to what those words mean?)." (emphasis in original)

Textualists argue courts should read the words of a statutory text as any ordinary Member of Congress would have read them. They look for the meaning "that a reasonable person would gather from the text of the law, placed alongside the remainder of the corpus juris [the body of law]." The textualist cares about the statutory purpose to the extent that is suggested from the text.

Textualist judges have contended, with much practical impact, that courts should not treat committee reports or sponsors' statements as authoritative evidence of legislative intent. These judges base their resistance to that interpretive practice on two major premises: first, that a 535-member legislature has no "genuine" collective intent concerning the proper resolution of statutory ambiguity (and that, even if it did, there would be no reliable basis for equating the views of a committee or sponsor with the "intent" of Congress as a whole); second, that giving weight to legislative history offends the constitutionally mandated process of bicameralism and presentment.

— John F. Manning, "Textualism as a Nondelegation Doctrine", 97 Colum. L. Rev. 673, 1997, JSTOR 1123360

Strict constructionism is often misused by laypersons and critics as a synonym for textualism. Nevertheless, although a textualist could be a strict constructionist, these are distinctive views. To illustrate this, we may quote Justice Scalia, who warns that "[t]extualism should not be confused with so-called strict constructionism, a degraded form of textualism that brings the whole philosophy into disrepute. I am not a strict constructionist, and no one ought to be... A text should not be construed strictly, and it should not be construed leniently; it should be construed reasonably, to contain all that it fairly means." Similarly, textualism should not be confused with the "plain meaning" approach, a simpler theory used prominently by the Burger Court in cases such as Tennessee Valley Authority v. Hill, which looked to the dictionary definitions of words, without reference to common public understanding or context.

== Methods ==
Textualism looks to the ordinary meaning of the language of the text, but it looks at the ordinary meaning of the text, not merely the possible range of meaning of each of its constituent words (see Noscitur a sociis):

The statute excludes only merchandise "of foreign manufacture," which the majority says might mean "manufactured by a foreigner" rather than "manufactured in a foreign country." I think not. Words, like syllables, acquire meaning not in isolation but within their context. While looking up the separate word "foreign" in a dictionary might produce the reading the majority suggests, that approach would also interpret the phrase "I have a foreign object in my eye" as referring, perhaps, to something from Italy. The phrase "of foreign manufacture" is a common usage, well understood to mean "manufactured abroad."

— K-Mart v. Cartier, 486 U.S. 281, 319 (1988) Scalia, J., concurring in part and dissenting in part

As an illustrative example, Justice Scalia refers to a case in which the law provided for a longer sentence when the defendant "uses a firearm" "during and in relation to" a "drug trafficking crime." In the case, the defendant had offered to trade an unloaded gun as barter for cocaine, and the majority (wrongly, in his view) took this meeting the standard for the enhanced penalty. He writes that "a proper textualist" would have decided differently: "The phrase 'uses a gun' fairly connoted use of a gun for what guns are normally used for, that is, as a weapon. As I put the point in my dissent, when you ask someone, 'Do you use a cane?' you are not inquiring whether he has hung his grandfather's antique cane as a decoration in the hallway." Justice Scalia has also written:

The meaning of terms on the statute books ought to be determined, not on the basis of which meaning can be shown to have been understood by a larger handful of the Members of Congress; but rather on the basis of which meaning is (1) most in accord with context and ordinary usage, and thus most likely to have been understood by the whole Congress which voted on the words of the statute (not to mention the citizens subject to it), and (2) most compatible with the surrounding body of law into which the provision must be integrated – a compatibility that, by a benign fiction, we assume Congress always has in mind. I would not permit any of the historical and legislative material discussed by the Court, or all of it combined, to lead me to a result different from the one that these factors suggest.

— Green v. Bock Laundry Mach. Co., 490 U.S. 504, 528 (1989) Scalia, J., concurring

Textualists do not, generally, accept the authority of the Courts to "refine" statutes:

Even if we were to assume, however, contrary to all reason, that every constitutional claim is ipso facto more worthy, and every statutory claim less worthy, of judicial review, there would be no basis for writing that preference into a statute that makes no distinction between the two. We have rejected such judicial rewriting of legislation even in the more appealing situation where particular applications of a statute are not merely less desirable but in fact raise "grave constitutional doubts." That, we have said, only permits us to adopt one rather than another permissible reading of the statute, but not, by altering its terms, "to ignore the legislative will in order to avoid constitutional adjudication.

— Webster v. Doe, 486 U.S. 592, 619 Scalia, J., dissenting

Textualists acknowledge the interpretive doctrine of lapsus linguae (slip of the tongue), also called "scrivener's error." This doctrine accounts for the situation when on the very face of the statute, it is apparent that there is a mistake of expression. (See, e.g., United States v. X-Citement Video, 513 U.S. 64) (1994) (Scalia, J., dissenting) ("I have been willing, in the case of civil statutes, to acknowledge a doctrine of 'scrivener's error' that permits a court to give an unusual (though not unheard of) meaning to a word which, if given its normal meaning, would produce an absurd and arguably unconstitutional result") and even break it (see, e.g., Green v. Bock Laundry Machine Co., 490 U.S. 504, 527) (1989) (Scalia, J., concurring) ("We are confronted here with a statute which, if interpreted literally, produces an absurd, and perhaps unconstitutional, result. Our task is to give some alternative meaning to the word "defendant" in Federal Rule of Evidence 609(a)(1) that avoids this consequence; and then to determine whether Rule 609(a)(1) excludes the operation of Federal Rule of Evidence 403.") Other textualists might reach alternative conclusions. Scalia's apparent inconsistency is perhaps explained by his choice to sometimes adhere to the more venerable judicial canons of interpretation, such as the constitutional avoidance canon.

The word "textualism" was first used by Mark Pattison in 1863 to criticize Puritan theology, according to the Oxford English Dictionary. Justice Robert Jackson first used the word "textualism" in a Supreme Court opinion a century later in Youngstown Sheet & Tube Co. v. Sawyer.

== Australia ==
Textualism was influential in Australia, and was particularly prominent in the interpretative approach of Sir Garfield Barwick. Amendments to the Acts Interpretation Act 1901 have rejected key elements of textualism, stating that statements made in the Second Reading speech by Ministers introducing an Act may be used in the interpretation of that act.

== Textualism v. purposivism ==
Purposivism is the perspective of statutory interpretation in which the judges should construe statutes to execute their legislative purpose. Textualism is the perspective of statutory interpretation in which the courts should read the words of that statutory text as any ordinary member of congress would have read them.

== See also ==
- Judicial activism
- Legal positivism
- Letter and spirit of the law
- Originalism
- Traditionalist theology (Islam)
