= Letter and spirit of the law =

Concepts in the philosophy of law

The letter of the law and the spirit of the law are two ways of interpreting rules or laws. To obey the "letter of the law" is to follow the literal reading of the words of the law, whereas following the "spirit of the law" is to follow the intention behind why the law was enacted. Although both are usually followed, the letter and the spirit are commonly discussed when they are in opposition. "Law" originally referred to legislative statutes, but in the idiom it may refer to any kind of rule. Intentionally following the letter of the law but not the spirit can involve exploiting technicalities, loopholes, and ambiguous language.

== Legal research ==
Violating the perceived intention, or "spirit", of the law has been found to influence judgments of culpability more strongly than violating the literal wording of the law.

1. A person can violate the letter of the law (but not the spirit) and not incur culpability.
2. A person can violate the spirit of the law and incur culpability, even without violating the letter of the law.
3. The greatest culpability is assigned when both the letter and the spirit of the law are violated.

== Shakespeare ==
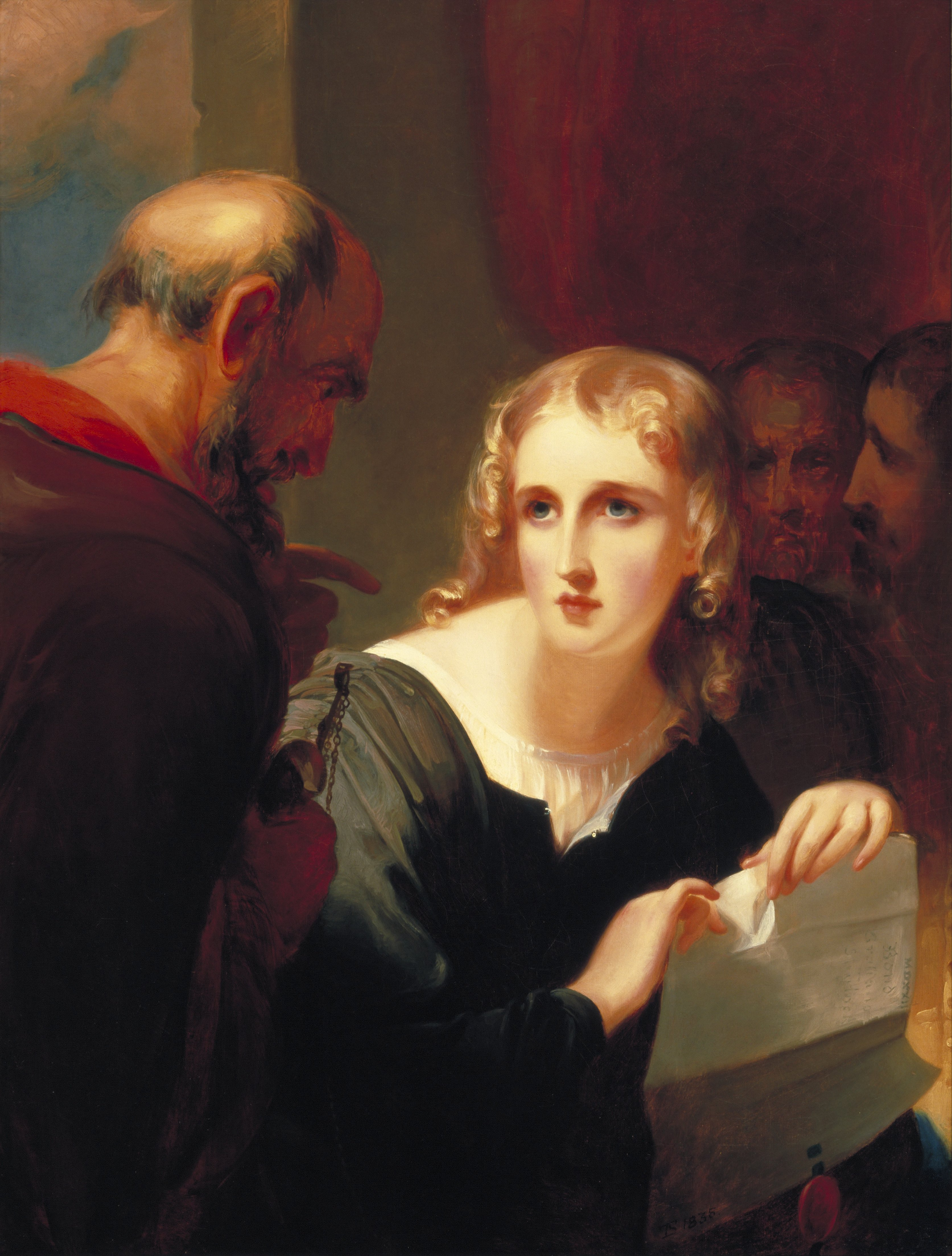
Portia and Shylock (1835) by Thomas Sully

William Shakespeare wrote numerous plays dealing with the letter-versus-spirit antithesis, almost always coming down on the side of "spirit" and often forcing villains (who sided with the letter) to make concessions. In one of the best-known examples, The Merchant of Venice, he introduces the quibble as a plot device to preserve both the spirit and the letter of the law. The moneylender Shylock has made an agreement with Antonio that if Antonio cannot repay a loan, Shylock will have a pound of flesh from him. When the debt is not repaid in time, Portia at first pleads for mercy in a famous speech: "The quality of mercy is not strain'd, It droppeth as the gentle rain from heaven Upon the place beneath. It is twice blest: It blesseth him that gives and him that takes." (IV, i, 185). When Shylock refuses, she finally saves Antonio by pointing out that Shylock's agreement with him mentions no blood, and therefore, Shylock can have his pound of flesh only if he sheds no blood.

== U.S. constitutional law ==
Interpretations of the U.S. Constitution have historically been divided on the "letter versus spirit" debate. For example, at its founding, the Federalist Party argued for a looser interpretation of the Constitution, granting Congress broad powers in keeping with the spirit and intent of the Founding Fathers, particularly those associated with the Federalist Party. The Federalists would have represented the "spirit" interpretation. In contrast, the Democratic-Republicans, who favored a limited federal government, argued for a strict interpretation of the Constitution, arguing that the federal government was granted only those powers enumerated in the Constitution and nothing not explicitly stated; they represented the "letter" interpretation.

Modern constitutional interpretation is also divided along these lines. Living Constitution scholars advocate for an interpretation based on the spirit of the document, although one grounded in a spirit that reflects broad powers. Originalist or textualist scholars advocate a more letter-based approach, arguing that the amendment process of the Constitution necessarily forecloses broader interpretations that can be accomplished by passing an amendment.

== The Bible ==
The New Testament discusses the distinction between the "letter" and "spirit" of the law, particularly in 2 Corinthians 3:6, where Paul contrasts the written code with the life-giving work of the Spirit. Scholar Boaz Cohen connected Paul's terminology with an older tradition of distinguishing the literal wording of a law from its underlying intention, a distinction also found in Greek, Roman, and Jewish legal interpretation. The Gospels likewise portray Jesus as emphasizing the purpose and underlying principles of the law rather than strict formalism. In the Parable of the Good Samaritan (Luke 10:25–37), for example, Jesus answers a question about the requirements of the law by emphasizing compassion and the command to love one's neighbour.

Christian interpretations have also connected this distinction with Jesus' statement that he came not to abolish the law but to fulfill it (Matthew 5:17). On this reading, the "spirit of the law" refers to the principles and purposes underlying the commandments, while the "letter" refers to their literal or formal requirements. The distinction has also been related to the new covenant described in Jeremiah 31:31–34, in which God's law is portrayed as being written on the heart rather than merely on tablets.

== Gaming the system ==
Gaming the system can be defined as using the rules and procedures of a system, meant to create an intended outcome in an intended situation, to manipulate the system for a desired result. This could be a different outcome, or to create the outcome in a situation it was not intended to be created in.

The first known documented use of the term "gaming the system" was in 1975. According to James Rieley, a British advisor to CEOs and an author, structures in companies and organizations (including explicit and implicit policies and procedures, stated goals, and mental models) drive behaviors that are detrimental to long-term organizational success and stifle competition. For some, error is the essence of gaming the system, in which a gap in protocol allows for erroneous practices that lead to unintended results.

Although the term generally carries negative connotations, gaming the system can be used for benign purposes, such as the undermining and dismantling of corrupt or oppressive organizations.

== See also ==
Law

- Judicial activism § Debate
- Expounding of the Law
- Golden rule (law) • Literal rule • Mischief rule • Purposive approach
- Legal abuse
- Legal fiction
- Legal opportunism
- Legal technicality
- Original intent • Original meaning • Textualism
- Statutory interpretation § Meaning
- The Spirit of Law, the 1748 political theory treatise by Montesquieu
- United States v. Kirby

Language

- Sense and reference

Others

- Loophole
- Malicious compliance • Work-to-rule
- Positive law • Natural law
