= Seaford Court Estates Ltd v Asher =

- Court: Court of Appeal
- Citation: [1949] 2 KB 481

Seaford Court Estates Ltd v Asher [1949] 2 KB 481 is a case English law concerning interpretation of an Act of Parliament.

== Judgment ==
Denning LJ held that the Act should be interpreted according to the mischief that Parliament was attempting to remedy, with consideration of the social conditions that prevailed at the time.

The question for decision in this case is whether we are at liberty to extend the ordinary meaning of "burden" so as to include a contingent burden of the kind I have described. Now this court has already held that this sub-section is to be liberally construed so as to give effect to the governing principles embodied in the legislation (Winchester Court Ltd v Miller); and I think we should do the same. Whenever a statute comes up for consideration it must be remembered that it is not within human powers to foresee the manifold sets of facts which may arise, and, even if it were, it is not possible to provide for them in terms free from all ambiguity. The English language is not an instrument of mathematical precision. Our literature would be much the poorer if it were. This is where the draftsmen of Acts of Parliament have often been unfairly criticized. A judge, believing himself to be fettered by the supposed rule that he must look to the language and nothing else, laments that the draftsmen have not provided for this or that, or have been guilty of some or other ambiguity. It would certainly save the judges trouble if Acts of Parliament were drafted with divine prescience and perfect clarity. In the absence of it, when a defect appears a judge cannot simply fold his hands and blame the draftsman. He must set to work on the constructive task of finding the intention of Parliament, and he must do this not only from the language of the statute, but also from a consideration of the social conditions which gave rise to it, and of the mischief which it was passed to remedy, and then he must supplement the written word so as to give "force and life" to the intention of the legislature. That was clearly laid down by the resolution of the judges in Heydon's case, and it is the safest guide to-day. Good practical advice on the subject was given about the same time by Plowden in his second volume Eyston v Studd. Put into homely metaphor it is this: A judge should ask himself the question: If the makers of the Act had themselves come across this ruck in the texture of it, how would they have straightened it out? He must then do as they would have done. A judge must not alter the material of which it is woven, but he can and should iron out the creases. Approaching this case in that way, I cannot help feeling that the legislature had not specifically in mind a contingent burden such as we have here. If it had would it not have put it on the same footing as an actual burden? I think it would. It would have permitted an increase of rent when the terms were so changed as to put a positive legal burden on the landlord. If the parties expressly agreed between themselves the amount of the increase on that account the court would give effect to their agreement. But if, as here, they did not direct their minds to the point, the court has itself to assess the amount of the increase. It has to say how much the tenant should pay "in respect of" the transfer of this burden to the landlord. It should do this by asking what a willing tenant would agree to pay and a willing landlord would agree to accept in respect of it. Just as in the earlier cases the courts were able to assess the value of the "fair wear and tear" clause, and of a "cooker." so they can assess the value of the hot water clause and translate it fairly in terms of rent; and what applies to hot water applies also to the removal of refuse and so forth. I agree that the appeal should be allowed, and with the order proposed by Asquith LJ.

== See also ==
- Heydon's case
- Pepper v Hart
- Re Spectrum Plus Ltd
