= DB v The Minister for Health =

2003 Irish Supreme Court case

DB v Minister for Health and Children and the Hepatitis C Compensation Tribunal [2003] 3 IR 12
- Coat of arms of Ireland
- Court: Supreme Court of Ireland
- Decided: 26 March 2003

Case history
- Appealed from: High Court
- Appealed to: Supreme Court

Court membership
- Judges sitting: Denham J. Murray J. McGuinness J. Hardiman J. Geoghegan J.

Case opinions
- Allowed the appeal
- Decision by: Denham J. Murray J. McGuinness J. Hardiman J. Geoghegan J.
- Concur/dissent: All Concurring

DB v The Minister for Health [2003] 3 IR 12, is an Irish Supreme Court case in which the Supreme Court highlighted that the literal approach (wording is interpreted using the "natural" and "ordinary" meaning of language) should always be used first when it comes to interpreting statutes. The Court also highlighted in this case that the only time the purposive approach (where intention of the lawmakers takes priority) should be used is if the literal approach leads to ambiguity or lack of clarity.

== Background ==
=== Facts of the case ===
The claimants case fell to be adjudicated by the statutory Tribunal which was created by the Hepatitis C Compensation Tribunal Act 1997. This Act was enacted to deal with the deficiencies of a previous non-statutory scheme. Both schemes were set up in order to compensate those who had contracted Hepatitis C through the use of certain blood products. The original non-statutory scheme did not contain provision for appeal or allow for aggravated damages and therefore any claim pending was to be heard by the newly formed statutory Tribunal created by the 1997 Act in accordance with its provisions. An award was made in favour of the DB (the respondent in the appeal) on 4 November 1997, which he accepted on 24 November 1997.

Section 5(9)(a) 1997 Act provides that "where the Tribunal makes an award to a claimant, the claimant shall have a period of one month ... from the date of receiving notice of the making of the award during which the claimant may decide in writing either to accept or reject the award or to appeal the award." Section 5(15) provided that a claimant could appeal "any decision" made by the Tribunal to the High Court. However, by accepting the award, the claimant waived any rights he might have had arising out of his claim.

On 22 April 1999, DB appealed against his award. In response, the Minister for Health made a preliminary application arguing two points. Firstly, the High Court would have no jurisdiction to hear the case as the claimant had accepted his award in writing and secondly, even where High Court jurisdiction could be established, the appeal had been brought outside of the one month time limit within Section 5(9)(a) 1997 Act.

=== History in lower courts ===
O'Neill J of the High Court held that the provisions contained within Section 5(9) 1997 Act regarding acceptance of an award did not exclude bringing an appeal to the High Court. In addition, it was held that although the time limit of one month had expired, the High Court could use its discretion under Order 122(7) of the Rules of the Superior Courts to extend such limit at it saw fit. O'Neill J also held in his judgement that the Tribunal did not have locus standi to appear before the court.

Both the Tribunal and the Minister for Health appealed to the Supreme Court.

The Supreme Court identified conditions under which appeals could be made to it in relation to section 5(9) of the 1997 act:

(i) Is a claimant appealing the award by the Tribunal "barred from doing so after the time in section 5(9)(a) of the Act of 1997 has passed?"

(ii) If not, "is a claimant who has accepted an award of the Tribunal barred from also appealing the award?"

(iii) "Does the Tribunal have a locus standi to appear in an application to the High Court or on an appeal?"

== Holding of the Supreme Court ==
Denham J., McGuinness J. and Geoghegan J. provided written judgments. Murray J. and Hardiman J. concurred.

=== The first question ===
The court provided that the core of the case was to construe the words of section 5(9)(a) 1997 Act and thus apply it to the construction of the respondent's claim. It also provided that the case turned on the interpretation of this section. The court noted that "[s]tatutes should be construed according to the intention expressed in the legislation. The words used in the statute best declare the intent of the Act. Where the language of the statute is clear we must give effect to it, applying the basic meaning of the words." Denham J went on to provide that the words in Section 5(9)(a) are "plain, they are precise and unambiguous". Owing to this, the judge provided that they should be given their natural and ordinary meaning in order to declare the best intention of the legislature. Therefore, a literal approach should be taken and thus the section should be considered word by word as it applied to the claimant.

After such analysis the court concluded that the answer to the first question should be in the affirmative - the claimant was barred from appealing after the expiration of the time limit contained within the section. The "plain language of the statute" made the intentions of the Oireachtas clear.

=== The second question ===
Using the literal approach, the answer to the second question was also in the affirmative. Denham J provided that there are three choices outlined in the provision: accept, reject or appeal. These choices have to be made within the time frame contained within the provision. A claimant who has accepted an award of the Tribunal is, therefore, barred from appealing the award. Therefore the claimant is barred from appealing the award as set out within the provisions of section 5(9)(a).

=== The third question ===
In coming to a conclusion regarding the third question of locus standi Denham J referenced Order 105(A), r 3(4) of the Rules of the Superior Courts which requires that the Tribunal be served with a copy of the appeal. The judge was satisfied that the service of the appeal "served to make the Tribunal a party". In this case the Tribunal was served with the pleadings. Therefore, the Tribunal had locus standi. In addition, the court highlighted the independent nature of Tribunals as distinct from the Minister. To ensure that its procedure was "correctly applied and implemented", the Tribunal should be heard within the appeal process.

Therefore, the court answered all three questions in the affirmative and allowed the appeal.
