= All four =

All four or All fours may refer to:

- All fours (human position)
- All fours (card game), 17th-century game still played today that gave rise to the All Fours family
- A concept in commanding precedent
- All Fours (album), by Bosse-de-Nage
- On All Fours, album
- All Fours (novel), a 2024 novel by Miranda July
