= Pepper (Inspector of Taxes) v Hart =

Leading English case on statutory interpretation

Pepper v Hart
- Court: House of Lords
- Full case name: Pepper (Her Majesty's Inspector of Taxes) v Hart
- Decided: 26 November 1992
- Citations: [1992] UKHL 3; [1993] AC 593; [1992] 3 WLR 1032
- Transcript: Full text of judgment

Case history
- Prior action: High Court of Justice ([1990] 1 WLR 204)
- Appealed from: Court of Appeal ([1991] Ch 203)

Court membership
- Judges sitting: Lord Mackay; Lord Keith; Lord Bridge; Lord Griffiths; Lord Ackner; Lord Oliver; Lord Browne-Wilkinson

Case opinions
- Lord Browne-Wilkinson (supported by Lords Keith, Griffiths, Ackner, Bridge and Oliver); Lord Mackay (dissenting)

Keywords
- Hansard; Legislative history; Parliamentary privilege; Statutory interpretation

Pepper (Inspector of Taxes) v Hart [1992] UKHL 3 is a landmark decision of the House of Lords on the use of legislative history in statutory interpretation. The court established the principle that when primary legislation is ambiguous then, in certain circumstances, the court may refer to statements made in the House of Commons or House of Lords in an attempt to interpret the meaning of the legislation. Before this ruling, such an action would have been seen as a breach of parliamentary privilege.

John Hart and nine others were teachers at Malvern College who benefited from a "concessionary fee" scheme that allowed their children to be educated at the college for one-fifth of the normal fees. The Inland Revenue attempted to tax this benefit based on the Finance Act 1976. There was a dispute over the correct interpretation of the act. The Special Commissioners charged with assessing the tax found in favour of Hart, but both the High Court of Justice and Court of Appeal of England and Wales found in favour of the Inland Revenue. The case then went to the House of Lords, which, making use of statements in Parliament as recorded in Hansard, found in favour of Hart. Lord Mackay, dissenting, argued that Hansard should not be considered admissible evidence because of the time and expense involved in a lawyer having to look up every debate and discussion on a particular statute when giving legal advice or preparing a case.

The decision met with a mixed reception. While judges cautiously accepted the judgment, some legal academics argued that it violated rules of evidence, damaged the separation of powers between the executive and Parliament and caused additional expense in cases. The decision was subjected to an assault by Lord Steyn in his Hart Lecture, delivered on 16 May 2000 and titled "Pepper v Hart: A Re-examination", in which he disputed exactly what the House of Lords had meant by their decision and also attacked the logic and legal theory behind it. Since Lord Steyn's lecture, several judicial decisions have limited the use of Pepper by the courts; the result of these changes, according to Stefan Vogenauer, is that "the scope of Pepper v Hart has been reduced to such an extent that the ruling has almost become meaningless".

== Facts ==
Hart and nine others were teachers at Malvern College, where from 1983 to 1986 they took advantage of a "concessionary fee" scheme, which allowed their children to be educated at rates one-fifth of those paid by other pupils. They disputed the amount of tax they had to pay under the Finance Act 1976, Section 63 of which said that:

The cash equivalent of any benefit chargeable to tax ... is an amount equal to the cost equivalent of the benefit, less so much (if any) of it as is made good by the employee to those providing the benefit ... the cost of a benefit is the amount of any expense incurred in or in connection with its provision, and (here and in those subsections) includes a proper proportion of any expense.

The Inland Revenue, attempting to tax this benefit, argued that the "cost" of the benefit meant an average of the cost of providing it; if there were 100 pupils at a school that cost £1 million per year to run, the "cost" per pupil was £10,000. Hart and his fellow teachers disputed this and argued that it was instead marginal cost, saying that other than food, stationery, laundry and similar there was no cost to the school due to the children's presence that would not be there already. The Special Commissioners (an appellate body for income tax claims), ruling in favour of Hart, noted that the school was not full to capacity, with the teachers' children having no impact on waiting lists; also that the "concessionary fee" covered all costs incurred by the school in the course of educating those particular pupils. It also emerged, later, that during debate on the Finance Act ministers had made statements in the House of Commons which supported the idea that such "benefits" should be excluded from tax.

== Judgment ==
=== High Court of Justice and Court of Appeal ===
Following the report of the Special Commissioners, the case was appealed to the High Court's Chancery Division, where it was heard by Vinelott J. In his judgment (issued 24 November 1989), Vinelott decided, based on the act, that "any expense incurred" referred to the average cost of keeping pupils, not the costs of keeping the teachers' children as pupils, reversing the Special Commissioners' decision. The case was then heard by the Court of Appeal, which issued its judgment on 13 November 1990. The three judges confirmed Vinelott's decision, ignoring the Hansard element of the case and confirming that, based on the Act's text, "any expense incurred" referred to the average cost.

=== House of Lords ===
Again appealed, the case came before a five-judge panel of the House of Lords. They initially agreed with the Court of Appeal by a 4–1 majority. At the end of the preliminary hearing, the judges became aware that, during the Finance Act's committee stage, Financial Secretary to the Treasury Robert Sheldon remarked (in response to a question about places for the children of teachers at fee-paying schools) "The removal of clause 54(4) will affect the position of a child of one of the teachers at the child's school because now the benefit will be assessed on the cost to the employer, which would be very small indeed in this case", implying that the "expense" is meant to be the cost to the school, not the average cost of having a pupil there. As a result of this discovery, the House of Lords chose to reconvene as a seven-judge panel, consisting of Lord Mackay, Lord Keith, Lord Bridge, Lord Griffiths, Lord Ackner, Lord Oliver and Lord Browne-Wilkinson.

The court reconvened and issued its judgment on 26 November 1992, read by Browne-Wilkinson. Browne-Wilkinson found in favour of Hart, and on the subject of Hansard wrote:

My Lords, I have come to the conclusion that, as a matter of law, there are sound reasons for making a limited modification to the existing rule [that Hansard may not be used] unless there are constitutional or practical reasons which outweigh them. In my judgment, subject to the questions of the privileges of the House of Commons, reference to Parliamentary material should be permitted as an aid to the construction of legislation which is ambiguous or obscure or the literal meaning of which leads to an absurdity. Even in such cases references in court to Parliamentary material should only be permitted where such material clearly discloses the mischief aimed at or the legislative intention lying behind the ambiguous or obscure words. In the case of statements made in Parliament, as at present advised I cannot foresee that any statement other than the statement of the Minister or other promoter of the Bill is likely to meet these criteria.

In prior cases, the fear had been expressed that using parliamentary debates as evidence in court could violate parliamentary privilege, under article 9 of the Bill of Rights 1688 (since using parliamentary debates as evidence would involve discussing what went on in Parliament within the courts). Browne-Wilkinson held that:

In my judgment, the plain meaning of article 9, viewed against the historical background in which it was enacted, was to ensure that Members of Parliament were not subjected to any penalty, civil or criminal for what they said and were able, contrary to the previous assertions of the Stuart monarchy, to discuss what they, as opposed to the monarch, chose to have discussed. Relaxation of the rule will not involve the courts in criticising what is said in Parliament. The purpose of looking at Hansard will not be to construe the words used by the Minister but to give effect to the words used so long as they are clear. Far from questioning the independence of Parliament and its debates, the courts would be giving effect to what is said and done there.

Agreeing with Browne-Wilkinson, Lord Griffiths also wrote, in regards to legislative interpretation, that:

The days have long passed when the courts adopted a strict constructionist view of interpretation which required them to adopt the literal meaning of the language. The courts now adopt a purposive approach which seeks to give effect to the true purpose of legislation and are prepared to look at much extraneous material that bears upon the background against which the legislation was enacted.

Mackay, in his dissenting judgment, came to the same conclusion as the rest of the House on the interpretation of the Finance Act, but without the use of Hansard. Although he agreed that such a use would not violate Article 9, he argued that it was not appropriate:

I believe that practically every question of statutory construction that comes before the courts will involve an argument that the case [could use Hansard]. It follows that the parties' legal advisors will require to study Hansard in practically every such case to see whether or not there is any help to be gained from it. I believe this is an objection of real substance. It is a practical objection not one of principle ... such an approach appears to me to involve the possibility at least of an immense increase in the cost of litigation in which statutory construction is involved.

For several judges, the use of Sheldon's statement in Parliament was a deciding factor. In the initial hearing, Lords Bridge, Browne-Wilkinson and Oliver were all in favour of dismissing Hart's case, later changing their mind with the new evidence available to them. Lord Griffiths, on the other hand, was not swayed by the use of Sheldon's statement; he wrote that "I should myself have construed the section in favour of the taxpayer without recourse to Hansard".

== Significance ==
=== Change to the law ===
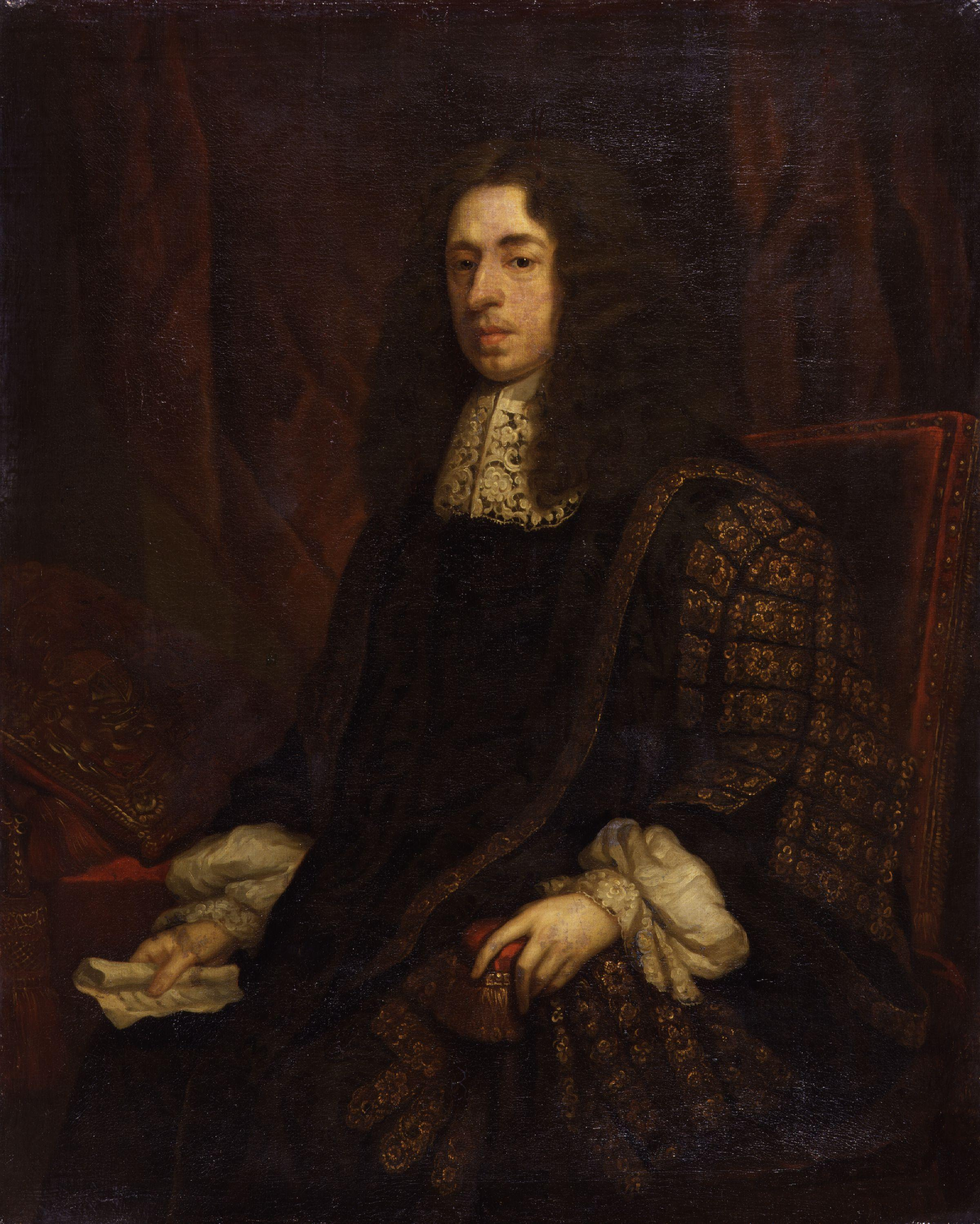
Lord Nottingham, who refused to apply the rule on parliamentary statements in Ash v Abdy

Before Pepper, it was impossible to use Parliamentary discussions as evidence in court cases; William Blackstone wrote in the 18th century that to allow judicial review of "unreasonable" legislation was to "set the judicial power above that of the legislature, which would be subversive of all government". Historically, the courts had been more lenient; while this suggestion first appears in the 14th century, with the intention that legislation was best interpreted by those who had written it, the principle was not strongly followed. In the 1678 case of Ash v Abdy, (Note: Ash v Abdy [1678] 3 Swan 644) Lord Nottingham chose to refer to the parliamentary history of the Statute of Frauds, and in Millar v Taylor, (Note: Millar v Taylor [1769] 4 Burr 2303) in 1769, the first case to explicitly state this principle (as "The sense and meaning of an Act of Parliament must be collected from what it says when passed into law, and not from the history of changes it underwent in the House where it took its rise"), the court chose to depart from it. The principle was most used during the 19th and 20th centuries, with a noted example being Beswick v Beswick, (Note: Beswick v Beswick [1968] AC 58) where Lord Reid maintained that it would be inconvenient and expensive for lawyers to have to refer to Hansard when preparing cases. Both the English and Scottish Law Commissions agreed with the rule in their 1969 Report on the Interpretation of Statutes.

During the late 20th century there was a gradual "retreat" from this rule; in Sagnata Investments Ltd v Norwich Corporation, (Note: Sagnata Investments Ltd v Norwich Corporation [1971] 2 QB 614) the courts allowed material to be submitted to determine the purpose of legislation (but not to interpret the statute), and in Pickstone v Freemans plc, (Note: Pickstone v Freemans plc [1989] AC 66) it was allowed to assist in the understanding of delegated legislation. A noted attack on the rule was made by Lord Denning in Davis v Johnson, (Note: Davis v Johnson [1979] AC 264) where he said that asserting that the courts could not use Hansard was similar to saying that the judges "should grope about in the dark for the meaning of an Act without switching on the light. In some cases Parliament is assured in the most explicit terms what the effect of a statute will be. It is on that footing that members assent to the clause being agreed to. It is on that understanding that an amendment is not pressed. In such cases I think the court should be able to look at the proceedings." Despite these exceptions, the courts regularly maintained that it was not possible to use internal Parliamentary discussions as an aid to legislative interpretation. The result of Pepper was a reversal of that rule; a court could use internal Parliamentary discussions where it was relevant to "the very point in question in the litigation", where a piece of legislation is "ambiguous or obscure, or the literal meaning of which leads to an absurdity", with the intention being to understand "the mischief aimed at or the legislative intention lying behind the ambiguous or obscure words".

The decision in Pepper has been linked to a positive move in statutory interpretation that had been proceeding since the end of the Second World War. Previously, the dominant approach was that of the literal rule, supplemented by the golden and mischief rules (that interpretations should not be made if they were to lead to absurdity, and that interpretations should take into account the intention behind the statute). These approaches all limited the amount of material which could be used by a judge when interpreting the actions of Parliament. Following the 1969 Law Commission report The Interpretation of Statutes, British courts began to use a more purposive approach, which directed that when interpreting a statute they should examine the purpose behind it, rather than simply using the text of the statute itself. In effect, this widened the amount of material judges could use, including not only the statute but reports made by government bodies, the Law Commission and Royal Commissions. The impact of Pepper was to include Hansard in this list of acceptable material, not only to establish the overall purpose of an act but to define what was meant by a particular provision.

=== In other jurisdictions ===
In other common law jurisdictions, interpretation for similar situations is significantly different. In Canada, for example, four different interpretative doctrines are used in understanding taxation laws; "strict construction, purposive interpretation, the plain meaning rule, and the words-in-total-context approach". In Stubart Investments Limited v The Queen, (Note: Stubart Investments Limited v The Queen [1984] 1 SCR 536) the Supreme Court of Canada decided to reject a strict approach and instead use the rule that "the words of an Act are to be read in their entire context and in their grammatical and ordinary sense harmoniously with the scheme of the Act, the object of the Act, and the intention of Parliament". Since then, however, both the purposive and plain meaning approaches have been used. Academics have rejected the idea that legislative history should be an aid to statutory interpretation, arguing, "It would introduce intolerable uncertainty ... if clear language in a detailed provision of [an] Act were to be qualified by unexpressed exceptions derived from a court's view of the object and purpose of the provision", and that it violates the rule of law, which requires that laws be performable. The average citizen does not have access to the legislative history of an act, which under the Pepper approach could very well change the meaning of the statute completely.

United States courts regularly use such interpretation, partially because there are significant differences between the British and American legislative systems. In the United States, legislation is regularly subject to negotiation and alteration after being introduced to Congress, and so it is in the courts' interest to look at the particular act's history when interpreting it. The range of sources accepted is "richer and more diverse", with individual Senators and Representatives and members of the Executive called to give evidence all valid. In the Supreme Court of the United States, 145 decisions (approximately 20 percent of the decisions given) between 1996 and 2005 reference legislative history. In the House of Lords and Supreme Court of the United Kingdom, only 9.8 percent of decisions use legislative history as a tool. It is noted, however, that the House of Lords and Supreme Court rely on statutes less often than the United States equivalent. Michael Healy, writing in the Stanford Journal of International Law, notes that the use of statutory interpretation in the US Supreme Court combined with the uncertainty over what approach the court will take means lawyers have to write extremely broad arguments, increasing the cost of litigation – a concern raised in Pepper.

=== Approval ===
J. C. Jenkins, Second Parliamentary Counsel at the Office of the Parliamentary Counsel, has expressed some approval at the decision. Firstly, he claims that it will significantly change the way legislation is drafted. Prior to Pepper, draftsmanship was a "time consuming" and "frustrating rather than enlightening" business. There are risks of "excessive detail, over-elaboration, verbosity, prolixity, iteration, tedious repetition", and so a draftsman avoids directly dealing with every single problem, instead following the rule set out by the Renton Committee to ensure that "sufficient certainty is obtained for a fair-minded and reasonable reader to be in no doubt what is intended, it being assumed that no one would take entirely perverse points against the draft, or that such points would be brushed aside by the court". The draftsman may be in conflict with a government official who wishes to be overly specific, where this general rule renders their concerns moot; in such situations, the ability to include a passage of a Minister's speech as a way to ensure that the courts will interpret legislation in a specific way may clear up any doubts they feel. As such, Jenkins feels that Pepper may make the jobs of parliamentary draftsmen much easier. Although one academic called Pepper a "long overdue" decision from "which there is no turning back", the overall reaction was a negative one. The decision can be interpreted as promoting legislative supremacy, a key point in a system where parliamentary sovereignty is confirmed.

=== Criticism ===
The House of Lords' statement on parliamentary privilege was assessed by the Joint Committee on Parliamentary Privilege, which recommended that Parliament not counter the decision in Pepper v Hart, but cautioned that this should not lead to any further weakening of parliamentary privilege. However, academics widely condemned the decision and the thinking behind it. Academic Aileen Kavanagh questioned the logic used; the House of Lords was essentially saying that, where a minister has made a statement about an act's intent that was not questioned by Parliament, that statement can be used as evidence. However, there are many reasons why Members of Parliament might not question a statement, and this does not necessarily indicate that they approve of it; in the case of the Finance Act, for example, it could simply be that as the statement was not going to be added to the statute, they found no reason to actively oppose it. At the same time, different Members of Parliament may approve of a statutory provision for different reasons. The fact that a minister gives certain reasons for including a provision does not necessarily indicate that Parliament agrees; only that Parliament also feels, for whatever reason, that the provision should be included. The decision also raises questions about the separation of powers in the United Kingdom; it has been consistently maintained that it is Parliament, not the executive, which passes legislation. If one accepts that statements by the executive can allow them to specify the meaning of particular laws without formally including them in statutes where they can be approved by Parliament, it violates this separation of powers, allowing the executive to make law.

With these issues, Kavanagh argues that there are likely to be consequences. Firstly, if judges replace the text of a statute with the meaning given to it by a single minister in Parliament, there is a risk that they will attribute a meaning to it which was not supported by the MPs; interpretations, based on the views of ministers, are more likely to reflect the executive's intention than that of Parliament. Kavanagh also suggests that it could impact on the actions of ministers; rather than attempting to specify law through the difficult route of placing it in legislation, they can simply make a statement within Parliament about the legislation's intent. Lord Mackay's worry that this would increase the cost of litigation was also considered; under Pepper, every lawyer must go through every word said in both Houses of Parliament and in the various committees to ensure that they are giving the best advice to their client. Academics have also expressed worry about the reliability of Hansard as a source; "the debate on the Bill is a battle of wits often carried out under extreme pressure and excitement where much more than the passage of this Bill may be at stake. The Ministers supporting it cannot be expected to act as if they were under oath in a court of law".

The decision also contradicted previous precedent as to the nature of evidence. John Baker notes that it violates strong rules which exclude the use of written evidence to interpret a document, unless the evidence was found in said document. Baker also argued that ministerial statements should not be used as evidence because they are irrelevant; "no individual member of Parliament is in a position to state what that intention is or to speak for the silent majority. Parliament acts as a corporate body and the only expression of its common intention is the text to which the Queen and both Houses have given their unqualified assent. What passes in one House is not formally known to the other". An individual MP's statements, minister or not, may be based on a false understanding of the legal issues; MPs regularly vote for proposals having disagreed with the statements of the spokesman simply because they like the proposal itself.

J. C. Jenkins, who interprets Pepper as making the jobs of parliamentary draftsmen much easier in some ways, also foresees it as making the job more difficult. Because of the added resources courts can draw on, there is now increased pressure to produce statutes which will not be interpreted in the wrong way. Departments sponsoring legislation normally prepare briefings for their ministers when talking in Parliament; draftsmen may now be expected to vet these, a time-consuming process. The draftsmen may also have to look at material produced by these departments other than the statutes, as it may be discussed in court; in Pepper, Lord Browne-Wilkinson considered a press release produced by the Inland Revenue. The decision also changes parliamentary practice. Under previous practice, if a minister was asked a question publicly and could not immediately reply with an answer, or publicly made a statement that later turned out to be incorrect, he would privately write a letter explaining or correcting himself. As a result of Pepper, such private replies may have to be made publicly. In addition, Members of Parliament are more aware that their statements, and those statements they induce ministers to make, may be looked at by the courts. As a result, these statements and inducements may be structured differently, and MPs may be more concerned that their issues be dealt with "at length and on the record", making parliamentary proceedings "more formal, more cluttered, and more protracted".

=== Interpretation and later development ===
There has been a dispute over the interpretation of the House of Lords' intent in regards to the use of Hansard in court, sparked by Lord Steyn's Hart Lecture on 16 May 2000, titled "Pepper v Hart: A Re-examination". Steyn suggested that Pepper v Hart was limited to "an estoppel argument", and Hansard's use in court should "be confined to the admission against the executive of categorical assurances given by ministers to Parliament"; essentially, that Hansard should only be used if the purpose is to establish that ministers made certain assurances to Parliament, with the intent being to prevent the executive going back on its promises. Stefan Vogenauer disagrees that this was the House of Lords' intent in Pepper, pointing out that Hart's counsel had, during proceedings, made an argument along the lines of estoppel – one the Lords had completely ignored when making their decision.

The courts' cautiously optimistic acceptance of Pepper, which included an attempt to include it in the House of Lords' Practice Directions, soon began to wane. Although the lower courts applied the decision and allowed the use of Hansard, and the Lords itself initially followed it in R v Warwickshire County Council, ex parte Johnson, (Note: R v Warwickshire County Council, ex parte Johnson [1993] 1 All ER 299) several objections and limits were expressed in later obiter dicta and ratio decidendi. The first judicial complaints were voiced in 1997 by Lord Hoffmann in The Intolerable Wrestle with Words and Meanings, where he criticised the increased expense and drop in efficiency which it created. In a speech to the Chancery Bar Lord Millett calling the judgment "a regrettable decision" that "was not only misguided in practical terms, it was in my view contrary to principle", saying that:

Lord Mackay of Clashfern dissented on practical grounds. He has been proved to be entirely right. The decision has added enormously to the costs of civil litigation. Whenever a statute falls to be construed, no counsel can afford to ignore its parliamentary history. The extra research is time consuming and costly, and wholly unproductive. Rather than see his time wasted, Counsel often feels obliged to place the fruits of his research before the court, thus prolonging the hearing at still more expense. Yet in the seven years since the decision, I am aware of no case where the material has been determinative, not even in Pepper v. Hart itself.

The courts immediately began to "whittle down" the precedent set by Pepper. The first direct attack came through Massey v Boulden, (Note: Massey v Boulden [2003] 2 All ER 87) where the Court of Appeal held that Hansard could not be used in criminal law cases, because of "the principle that penal statutes are to be narrowly construed intervenes to resolve any ambiguity without resort to Hansard".

In Robinson v Secretary of State for Northern Ireland, Lords Hobhouse, Hoffmann and Millett said that Mackay, with his dissenting judgment, had "turned out to be the better prophet", with large amounts of inefficiency and expense associated with Pepper. In the Secretary of State for the Environment, Transport and the Regions v Spath Holme judicial review case, (Note: Secretary of State for the Environment, Transport and the Regions v Spath Holme [2001] 2 WLR 15) Lords Bingham, Hope and Hutton held that Hansard could only be used in pursuit of "ascertaining the meaning of a particular word or phrase", rather than simply where a piece of legislation is "ambiguous or obscure, or the literal meaning of which leads to an absurdity". In McDonnell v Congregation of Christian Brothers Trustees, (Note: McDonnell v Congregation of Christian Brothers Trustees [2003] UKHL 63) the Lords further limited the use of Hansard, saying it could not be used to overrule precedent set before courts were able to reference it, except in exceptional circumstances. Wilson and others v Secretary of State for Trade and Industry, (Note: Wilson and others v Secretary of State for Trade and Industry [2003] UKHL 40) the first case involving Hansard after the Human Rights Act 1998 put further limits on its use; ministerial statements made in Parliament cannot be treated as sources of law, only as supporting evidence. This "retreat" from Pepper was resisted in the Court of Appeal, primarily by Lord Phillips, who praised the decision following Steyn's lecture in 2000, but has been repeatedly emphasised in the House of Lords and Supreme Court of the United Kingdom. As a result of these changes, Stefan Vogenauer has said that "the scope of Pepper v Hart has been reduced to such an extent that the ruling has almost become meaningless".

Despite the judicial criticism and limits placed on Pepper, references to Hansard have apparently increased since the beginning of the 21st century. It is also noted that the most recent generation of House of Lords and Supreme Court judges have been willing to regularly reference legislative history in their arguments. In Harding v Wealands, (Note: Harding v Wealands [2006] UKHL 32) for example, three Law Lords were willing to apply Pepper, even Lord Hoffmann who had previously voiced concerns. Lord Carswell noted that Pepper had been "out of judicial favour in recent years", but added that legislative history was "perhaps especially [useful] as a confirmatory aid".

== Case citations ==
- Citation format: litigants; year of decision; abbreviated title of the court/reporter; the decision or page number

== Bibliography ==
Primary sources

- Glover, Harold (1976). "Finance Act 1976" (PDF). Her Majesty's Stationery Office.
- "Pepper (Inspector of Taxes) v Hart [1992] UKHL 3 (26 November 1992)". BAILII.

Secondary sources

- Baker, John (1993). "Statutory Interpretation and Parliamentary Intention". Cambridge Law Journal. 52 (3). Cambridge University Press: 353–357. doi:10.1017/S0008197300099761. ISSN 0008-1973. S2CID 145664037.
- Bates, T. (1995). "The Contemporary Use of Legislative History in the United Kingdom". Cambridge Law Journal. 54 (1). Cambridge University Press: 127–152. doi:10.1017/S0008197300083185. ISSN 0008-1973. S2CID 145234815.
- Bradley, Anthony Wilfred; Ewing, Keith (2007). Constitutional and administrative law (14th ed.). Pearson Education. ISBN 978-1-4058-1207-8.
- Brudney, James J. (2007). "Below the Surface: Comparing Legislative History Usage by The House of Lords and The Supreme Court". Washington University Law Review. 85 (1). Washington University School of Law. ISSN 0043-0862.
- Davies, Denzil (1993). "Pepper v. Hart". British Tax Review. 1993 (2). Sweet & Maxwell. ISSN 0007-1870.
- Duff, David G. (1999). "Interpreting the Income Tax Act – Part 1: Interpretative Doctrines". Canadian Tax Journal. 47 (3). Canadian Tax Foundation. ISSN 0008-5111.
- Duff, David G. (1999). "Interpreting the Income Tax Act – Part 2: Toward a Pragmatic Approach". Canadian Tax Journal. 47 (4). Canadian Tax Foundation. ISSN 0008-5111.
- Dyson, Jacqueline (1990). "Pepper v Hart". British Tax Review. 1990 (3). Sweet & Maxwell. ISSN 0007-1870.
- Girvin, Stephen D. (1993). "Hansard and the Interpretation of Statutes". Anglo-American Law Review. 22 (497). Tolley Publishing. ISSN 0308-6569.
- Healy, Michael P. (1999). "Legislative Intent and Statutory Interpretation in England and the United States: An Assessment of the Impact of Pepper v Hart". Stanford Journal of International Law. 35 (231). Stanford University Press. ISSN 0731-5082.
- Jenkins, J.C. (1994). "Pepper v Hart: A Draftsman's Perspective". Statute Law Review. 15 (1). Oxford University Press: 23–30. doi:10.1093/slr/15.1.23. ISSN 0144-3593.
- Kavanagh, Aileen (2005). "Pepper v Hart and matters of constitutional principle". Law Quarterly Review. 121 (1). Sweet & Maxwell. ISSN 0023-933X.
- Klug, Francesca (1999). "The Human Rights Act 1998, Pepper v. Hart and all that". Public Law. 43 (2). Sweet & Maxwell. ISSN 0033-3565.
- Littleboy, Charlotte; Richard Kelly (2005). "Pepper v Hart". Commons Briefing Papers (SN00392). Library of the House of Commons.
- Millett, Peter (1999). "Construing Statutes". Statute Law Review. 1999 (20). Oxford University Press. ISSN 1464-3863.
- Nyman, Bernard M. (1993). "Interpretation: courts may refer to Hansard as an aid to interpretation in ambiguous cases". Entertainment Law Review. 4 (3). Sweet & Maxwell. ISSN 0959-3799.
- Scott, Colin (1993). "Pricing offences and statutory interpretation after Pepper v Hart". Journal of Business Law. 1993 (3). Sweet & Maxwell. ISSN 0021-9460.
- Stallworthy, Mark (1993). "Construing Acts of Parliament in the United Kingdom: reference to Parliamentary debates – Pepper v Hart". International Company and Commercial Law Review. Sweet & Maxwell. ISSN 0958-5214.
- Steyn, Johan (2001). "Pepper v Hart; a re-examination". Oxford Journal of Legal Studies. 21 (1). Oxford University Press: 59–72. doi:10.1093/ojls/21.1.59. ISSN 0143-6503.
- Styles, Scott C. (1994). "The Rule of Parliament: Statutory Interpretation after Pepper v Hart". Oxford Journal of Legal Studies. 14 (158). Oxford University Press. doi:10.1093/ojls/14.1.151. ISSN 1464-3820.
- Vogenauer, Stefan (2005). "A retreat from Pepper v Hart? A reply to Lord Steyn". Oxford Journal of Legal Studies. 25 (4). Oxford University Press: 629–674. doi:10.1093/ojls/gqi027. ISSN 0143-6503.
