= Purposive approach =

Rule of statutory interpretation

The purposive approach (sometimes referred to as purposivism, purposive construction, purposive interpretation, or the modern principle in construction) is an approach to statutory and constitutional interpretation under which common law courts interpret an enactment (a statute, part of a statute, or a clause of a constitution) within the context of the law's purpose.

Purposive interpretation is a derivation of mischief rule set in Heydon's Case, and intended to replace the mischief rule, the plain meaning rule and the golden rule. Purposive interpretation is used when the courts use extraneous materials from the pre-enactment phase of legislation, including early drafts, hansards, committee reports, and white papers.

Israeli jurist Aharon Barak views purposive interpretation as a legal construction that combines subjective and objective elements. Barak states that the subjective elements include the intention of the author of the text, whereas the objective elements include the intent of the reasonable author and the legal system's fundamental values.

Critics of purposivism argue it fails to separate the powers between the legislator and the judiciary, as it allows more freedom in interpretation by way of extraneous materials in interpreting the law.

== Historical origins ==
=== Plain meaning rule ===
The plain meaning rule gained popularity during the 18th and 19th centuries as the courts took an increasingly strict view of the words within statutes. Under the plain meaning rule, courts give the words of a statute their natural or ordinary meaning. One of the leading statements of the plain meaning rule was made by Chief Justice Nicholas Conyngham Tindal in the Sussex Peerage case (1844), concerning whether Augustus d'Este succeeded to the titles of his father Prince Augustus Frederick, Duke of Sussex, and in particular, whether the marriage of his father and mother was valid under the Royal Marriages Act 1772:

... the only rule for the construction of Acts of Parliament is, that they should be construed according to the intent of the Parliament which passed the Act. If the words of the statute are in themselves precise and unambiguous, then no more can be necessary than to expound those words in their natural and ordinary sense. The words themselves alone do, in such case, best declare the intention of the lawgiver.

A strict application of the plain meaning rule can sometimes result in "absurd" outcomes. Examples of the plain meaning rule producing absurd outcomes can be seen in the following cases:

- In Whitely v Chappel (1868), a statute made it an offence "to impersonate any person entitled to vote". The defendant used the vote of a dead man. The statute relating to voting rights required a person to be living to be entitled to vote. The plain meaning rule was applied, and the defendant was thus acquitted.
- In R v Harris (1836), the defendant had bitten off his victim's nose. Nevertheless, because the statute made it an offence "to stab cut or wound", the court held that under the plain meaning rule, the act of biting did not come within the meaning of stab cut or wound as these words implied an instrument had to be used. The court overturned the defendant's conviction.
- In Fisher v Bell (1961), the Restriction of Offensive Weapons Act 1958 made it an offence to "offer for sale" an offensive weapon. The defendant had a flick knife displayed in his shop window with a price tag on it. The statute made it a criminal offence to "offer" such flick knives for sale. The court overturned his conviction because the display of goods in a shop is not an "offer" in the technical sense but an invitation to treat. The court applied the plain meaning rule of statutory interpretation.

=== Golden rule ===
The golden rule permits the courts to depart from the plain meaning rule if the meaning leads to consequences it considers to be absurd or ambiguous. This was propounded in Grey v Pearson(1857) where Lord Wensleydale stated

In construing ... statutes ... the grammatical and ordinary sense of the words is to be adhered to, unless that would lead to some absurdity, or some repugnance or inconsistency with the rest of the instrument, in which case the grammatical and ordinary sense of the words may be modified, so as to avoid the absurdity and inconsistency, but no farther.

The degree of absurdity or ambiguity necessary to exercise the golden rule is determined on a case-by-case basis by the individual judge in question. There are two general situations in which the golden rule may be employed: narrowly, to take the 'better' reading of two alternatives, or more widely, to broaden a rule that, although unambiguous, leads to an absurd outcome.

The case Maddox v Storer [1963] 1 QB 451 is typical of the more narrow use. In Maddox, the defendant travelled at over the 30 mph speed limit in a minibus with eleven seats (excluding that of the driver), most of which were unoccupied. Per the Road Traffic Act 1960, travelling at over 30 mph in a vehicle "adapted to carry more than seven passengers" was an offence. The court held that adapted to could be taken to mean suitable for, rather than necessarily implying an alteration to the original design.

The court applied the golden rule in a broader sense in Adler v George (1964). Under the Official Secrets Act 1920, it was an offence to obstruct an armed forces member "in the vicinity" of a prohibited place. The defendant was actually in the prohibited place, rather than "in the vicinity" of it, at the time of obstruction. The courts had to determine whether "in [the] vicinity of" included on/in the premises. The court applied the golden rule. The court said that "in the vicinity" did include on or in as well. It would be absurd for a person to be liable if they were near a prohibited place and not if they were actually in it. Therefore, the court upheld the defendant's conviction.

In Re Sigsworth (1935), a son had murdered his mother. Under slayer or forfeiture rules of long standing in England, he would have been excluded as a beneficiary under her will. She had, however, died intestate, and the Administration of Estates Act 1925 provided that her son would inherit. Although the situation was unambiguous, the absurdity inherent in such a situation meant that forfeiture had to be treated as applicable to intestacy rules taking the place of a will as well as wills themselves.

=== Mischief rule ===
In Construction of Statutes, Elmer Driedger defines the mischief rule as follows:

A statute is to be so construed as to suppress the mischief and advance the remedy, thus giving the courts considerable latitude in achieving the objective of the legislature despite any inadequacy in the language employed by it.

Heydon's Case (1584) laid out the following statement of the principles underlying what would come to be called the "mischief rule":

For the sure and true interpretation of all statutes four things are to be discerned and considered:

- 1st. What was the common law before the making of the Act.
- 2nd. What was the mischief and defect for which the common law did not provide.
- 3rd. What remedy the Parliament hath resolved and appointed to cure the disease of the Commonwealth.
- 4th. The true reason of the remedy; and then the office of all the Judges is always to make such construction as shall suppress the mischief, and advance the remedy, and to suppress subtle inventions and evasions for continuance of the mischief, and pro privato commodo, and to add force and life to the cure and remedy, according to the true intent of the makers of the Act, pro bono publico.

The mischief rule saw further development in Corkery v Carpenter (1951). In a decision of the Court of King's Bench, the Court had to decide whether a bicycle could be classified as a carriage. According to s. 12 of the Licensing Act 1872, a person found drunk in charge of a carriage on the highway can be arrested without a warrant. A man was arrested drunk in charge of a bicycle. According to the plain meaning rule, a bicycle is not a carriage. Under the mischief rule, the bicycle could constitute a carriage. The mischief the act was attempting to remedy was people being on the road on transport while drunk. Therefore, a bicycle could be classified as a carriage.

In Smith v Hughes (1960), the defendant was charged under the Street Offences Act 1959, which made it an offence to solicit prostitution in a public place. The defendant was soliciting from within private premises (windows or on balconies), so they could be seen by the public without entering into the streets. The court applied the mischief rule, holding that the defendant's activities were within the mischief of the Act, and soliciting from within a house is soliciting and molesting of the public. Therefore, it is the same as if the defendant was outside on the street.

In Royal College of Nursing of the UK v DHSS (1981), the Royal College of Nursing brought an action challenging the legality of the involvement of nurses in carrying out abortions. The Offences Against the Person Act 1861 made it an offence for any person to carry out an abortion. The Abortion Act 1967 provides an absolute defence for a medical practitioner provided certain well-known conditions are satisfied. Discoveries in medicine meant that surgery had more often been replaced with the administration of hormones, commonly by nurses. The courts were responsible for determining whether they were acting unlawfully, not being "medical practitioners" as defined under the Act. The House of Lords ruled that the Act was intended to provide for safe abortions and that nurses could carry out such abortions provided that a doctor had prescribed the treatment and accepted responsibility for its conduct throughout the procedure.

== Aids to interpretation ==
=== Internal aids to statute interpretation ===
Generally, prima facie must be given as a general rule of statutory interpretation. If the words are clear and free from ambiguity, there is no need to refer to other means of interpretation. However, if the words in the statute are vague and ambiguous, then internal aid may be consulted for interpretation. Judges should read a statute as a whole; what is not clear in one section may be explained in another section.

Internal aids include the following:

- Context
- Title
  - Long Title
  - Short Title
- Preamble
- Headings
- Proviso
- Definition/interpretation Clause
- Conjunctive and Disjunctive Words
- Punctuation

=== External aids to statute interpretation ===
Aids external to a statute (i.e., not part of an act) can also be used as a recourse, including:

- Historical Settings
- Objects and Reason
- Text Books and Dictionaries
- International Convention
- Government Publications
  - Committee Reports
  - Other Documents
- Bill
- Select Committee Report
- Debate and Proceedings of the Legislature
- State of Things at the Time of the Passing of the Bill
- History of Legislation
- Extemporaneous Exposition
- Judicial Interpretation of Words

== Australia ==
Section 15AA of the Acts Interpretation Act 1901 of Australia states that the interpretation that best achieves the purpose or object of a Commonwealth act is preferred to all other interpretations. Equivalent provisions are contained in the interpretation acts enacted in most Australian States and Territories. When determining the purpose of a statutory provision, courts ought to keep in mind the contexts for the provision at the outset rather than only when ambiguity or inconsistency exists. The statutory context 1) explanatory memoranda that are relevant to the statute and 2) reports of advisory bodies, such as law commissions, that created the need for the particular statutory provisions. (See CIC Insurance Limited v Bankstown Football Club Limited(1997) 187 CLR 384 at 408; also see Acts Interpretation Act 1901 (Cth), s15AB.)

Whereas other common law countries embraced purposivism much earlier, the High Court of Australia has only been receptive to purposivism since the 1970s. Historically, Australian legalism (a variant of originalism) persevered for many years following the landmark decision in the Engineers Case. Sometimes considered aggressively textualist, Australian legalism emphasizes the importance of and attends only to the words in the statute when determining meaning.

The Court remains entrenched in the tradition of textualism and original meaning more than the typical European, Canadian, or even American jurist; however, Justice McHugh refers to Australian legalism as "faint-hearted", as the Court's focus on textualism does not preclude its ability to evaluate extrinsic evidence. The move away from staunch textualism is primarily attributed to the "revolution" of the Mason Court.

=== Mason Court ===
The Mason Court's utilization of legislative debates marks the departure from strict Australian legalism. Along with the other radical innovations of the Mason Court, the use of extraneous materials has resulted in considerable tension between textualist history and the purposive future. While there has been some retrogressive action since the Mason Court, Australian constitutional interpretation is now arguably pluralistic, similar to that of the United States.

According to Australian jurist Jeffrey Goldsworthy the Mason Court's "revolutionary" attitude is partially attributed to Mason, Deane, and Gaudron all receiving their education from the University of Sydney where they were exposed to "more pragmatic, consequentialist legal theories than many of their predecessors".

== Canada ==
=== Statutory interpretation ===
In Canada, the purposive approach was developed and expanded by Elmer Driedger in his 1974 book, The Construction of Statutes. Driedger referred to this approach not as "purposive", but as "the modern principle" of statutory interpretation.

In many cases, the Supreme Court of Canada has endorsed this approach; it is now the dominant approach to statutory interpretation.

In Re Rizzo & Rizzo Shoes Ltd, [1998] Justice Iacobucci, speaking for the whole court, wrote the following:

Elmer Driedger in Construction of Statutes (2nd ed. 1983) best encapsulates the approach upon which I prefer to rely. He recognizes that statutory interpretation cannot be founded on the wording of the legislation alone. At p. 87, he states: "Today there is only one principle or approach, namely, the words of an Act are to be read in their entire context and their grammatical and ordinary sense harmoniously with the scheme of the Act, the object of the Act, and the intention of Parliament."

Justice Iacobucci went on to cite section 10 of Ontario's quasi-constitutional Interpretation Act, which stated, "Every Act shall be deemed to be remedial ... and shall accordingly receive such fair, large and liberal construction and interpretation as will best ensure the attainment of the object of the Act according to its true intent, meaning and spirit." Similar provisions exist in the Interpretation Act of each province of Canada and at the federal level.

The purposive approach was reinforced in Bell ExpressVu Limited Partnership v. Rex, [2002] , where Justice Iacobucci, again for the whole court, reiterated that Driedger's rule is the overarching approach to statutory interpretation in Canada. Other philosophies, such as a strict interpretation of penal statutes, may apply in the case of an ambiguity, but only in the case of an ambiguity that arises following the application of the modern rule.

The Supreme Court ruling in Free World Trust v. Électro Santé Inc. [2000] set out "the test for patent infringement" and "the principles of purposive claim construction".

=== Constitutional interpretation ===
Purposive interpretation is also used in constitutional interpretation. In R. v. Big M Drug Mart Ltd., [1985], Justice Dickson, speaking for the majority of the court, wrote, at paragraph 116:

[T]he proper approach to the definition of the rights and freedoms guaranteed by the Charter was a purposive one. The meaning of a right or freedom guaranteed by the Charter was to be ascertained by an analysis of the purpose of such a guarantee; it was to be understood, in other words, in the light of the interests it was meant to protect. In my view this analysis is to be undertaken, and the purpose of the right or freedom in question is to be sought by reference to the character and the larger objects of the Charter itself, to the language chosen to articulate the specific right or freedom, to the historical origins of the concepts enshrined, and where applicable, to the meaning and purpose of the other specific rights and freedoms with which it is associated within the text of the Charter. The interpretation should be ... a generous rather than a legalistic one, aimed at fulfilling the purpose of the guarantee and securing for individuals the full benefit of the Charter's protection. At the same time it is important not to overshoot the actual purpose of the right or freedom in question, but to recall that the Charter was not enacted in a vacuum, and must therefore ... be placed in its proper linguistic, philosophic and historical contexts.

== England and Wales ==
A 1969 report of the English Law Commission proposed that the English courts should adopt a purposive approach. That endorsement did much to boost the profile and credibility of the approach. However, several decades would still pass before it would win acceptance outside of narrow fields of English law (such as estoppels and absurdities), enshrined by cases such as the Earl of Oxford's case (1615).

In 1982, Lord Diplock, giving the leading judgment for the House of Lords in the case of Catnic Components Ltd v Hill & Smith Ltd, held that patent claims should be given a purposive construction.

Lord Clyde stated in 1998 that a purposive construction was "particularly appropriate where the validity of legislation has to be tested against the provisions of European law", because in that field, "it is proper to strain to give effect to the design and purpose behind the legislation".

The leading case in which the purposive approach was adopted by the House of Lords was Pepper v Hart [1993] AC 593. This established the principle that when primary legislation is ambiguous and, specific criteria are satisfied, courts may refer to statements made in the House of Commons or the House of Lords to determine the intended meaning of the legislation. Before the ruling, such an action would have been seen as a breach of parliamentary privilege. The House of Lords held that courts could now take a purposive approach to interpret legislation when the traditional methods of statutory construction are in doubt or would result in an absurdity.

To determine what Parliament intended, courts may consult all sources, including Hansard. Lord Griffiths stated:

My Lords, I have long thought that the time had come to change the self-imposed judicial rule that forbade any reference to the legislative history of an enactment as an aid to its interpretation. The ever increasing volume of legislation must inevitably result in ambiguities of statutory language which are not perceived at the time the legislation is enacted. The object of the court in interpreting legislation is to give effect so far as the language permits to the intention of the legislature. If the language proves to be ambiguous I can see no sound reason not to consult Hansard to see if there is a clear statement of the meaning that the words were intended to carry. The days have long passed when the courts adopted a strict constructionist view of interpretation which required them to adopt the literal meaning of the language. The courts now adopt a purposive approach which seeks to give effect to the true purpose of legislation and are prepared to look at much extraneous material that bears upon the background against which the legislation was enacted. Why then cut ourselves off from the one source in which may be found an authoritative statement of the intention with which the legislation is placed before Parliament?

== Israel ==
Israel's legal community is largely purposivist and has rejected such methods of interpretation as narrow textualism and static historicism. The term "purposive interpretation" began to appear in Israel at the end of the 1960s and the beginning of the 1970s.

Aharon Barak is Israel's best-known champion of purposivism. His particular form of purposivism includes a synthesis of subjective elements, such as the author's intent, with objective elements, such as textual evidence. Barak believes the text to be the source of purpose but is ready to go beyond the text in some circumstances to examine the subjective purposes of the text's author. Barak believes intentionalism is too limited in its assessment of subjectivity.

"On a number of occasions, Justice Barak of the Israeli Supreme Court has remarked that, in the enactment of its new Basic Laws on human rights, Israel walks in the path of the Canadian Charter of Rights and Freedoms". Barak has encouraged Israel's judiciary to refer to the Canadian Supreme Court's purposive approach to Charter rights and its rights-forwarding orientation. Barak has written in support of purposive interpretation and applied it while serving as a Justice to the Supreme Court of Israel. In CA 165/82 Kibbutz Hatzor v Assessing Officer, 39(2) P.D 70, his judgment was seen as a turning point in interpreting tax law in Israel, establishing that a purposive approach was generally preferred to textualism in determining the meaning of the law.

== New Zealand ==
Section 5(1) of the Interpretation Act 1999 states that Acts must be interpreted according to their purpose.

== United States ==
American jurists Henry M. Hart, Jr. and Albert Sacks are considered early proponents of American purposivism. Their work helped to promote purposivism as a credible method of interpretation. Purposivism in the United States is considered a strain of originalism, alongside textualism and intentionalism. While the interpretation debate's current focus is between textualism and intentionalism, purposivism is gaining favor. Purposivism in the United States is used to interpret a statute with broadly worded text and a seemingly clear purpose. When employing purposivism, the court is concerned with understanding the law's purpose or "spirit". Once the purpose is identified, the text is then read accordingly. To determine and interpret the purpose of a statute, courts may consult extraneous aids.

The following extraneous aids have been ranked from least authoritative to most authoritative: subsequent history, nonlegislator proponents of drafters, rejected proposals, colloquy on floor & hearing, sponsor statements, and committee reports. Each of these extraneous aids is given a weight corresponding to its position in the hierarchy.

The academic literature indicates several variations of purposivism. For example, Abbe Gluck said, "There are different stripes of purposivists...” Jennifer M. Bandy stated, "Thus, Justice Breyer's strain of purposivism focuses on understanding the law in relation to both the people who passed it and the people who must live with it." Degrees of purposivism are sometimes referred to as 'strong' or 'weak'.

Justice Stephen Breyer considered determining and interpreting the purpose of a statute paramount. An apt example of Breyer's approach might be his dissent in Medellín v. Texas (2008), where he faulted the court's construction of a treaty because "it looks for the wrong thing (explicit textual expression about self-execution) using the wrong standard (clarity) in the wrong place (the treaty language)"; in response, the Court "confess[ed] that we do think it rather important to look to the treaty language to see what it has to say about the issue. That is after all what the Senate looks to in deciding whether to approve the treaty".

As opposed to Justice Breyer's strong form of purposivism, "weak purposivists" might consult the statute's purpose only as a device for interpreting vague provisions of its text and in no circumstances override the text.
