= Legal opportunism =

Legal opportunism is a term coined in a 2015 article in the Journal of Business Research to describe litigation following an IPO to recover potential losses after negative stock developments, regardless of the legal merits of the claim. The authors conclude that the best predictor of post-IPO litigation is not the legal merits of any potential claim, but rather the amount of potential recovery and the assets of the targeted corporation.
