= Commanding precedent =

In law, a commanding precedent is a precedent whose facts are "on all fours" with the case at hand. In other words, it almost exactly tracks it, sharing near-identical facts and issues. A commanding precedent is also referred to as a "Goose" case in Louisiana; "Spotted Horse" or "Spotted Dog" cases in Alabama; "Cow" case in Kansas; and "White Horse" or "White Pony" cases in Texas. A legal rule can be "clearly established" without commanding precedent existing. For example, in the United States, a governmental official is generally protected by qualified immunity if his acts were objectively legally reasonable, but such protection may not apply if, in light of pre-existing law, the unlawfulness of his conduct would have been apparent to a reasonably competent official, even if no commanding precedent applicable to his specific behavior existed.

== See also ==
- Nuremberg defense
