= Heydon's Case =

1584 English court case

- Court: Exchequer of Pleas
- Decided: Easter Term, 1584
- Citations: EWHC Exch J36; 3 Co Rep 7a 76 ER 637; Pasch 26 Eliz plea began 20 Eliz Rot 140

Case history
- Prior actions: Pasch 26 Eliz, plea began 20 Eliz Rot 140

Court membership
- Judge sitting: Roger Manwood CB

Keywords
- Mischief rule

Heydon's Case (1584) 76 ER 637 is considered a landmark case: it was the first case to use what would come to be called the mischief rule of statutory interpretation. The mischief rule is more flexible than the golden or literal rule, in that the mischief rule requires judges to look over four tasks to ensure that gaps within the law are covered.

== Facts of the case ==
The case is a construction of leases, life estates, and statutes.

Ottery College, (Note: Some editions of Lord Coke's works give the name of the college and manor as "Otlery") a religious college, in 1536 gave a tenancy in a manor in Devon, also called Ottery, to a man, Ware, and his son, also referred to as Ware. They are referred to in the case report as "Ware the father and Ware the son".

The tenancy was established by copyhold. Ware and his son held their copyhold for their lives, subject to the will of the lord and the custom of the manor. The Wares' copyhold was part of a parcel also occupied by some tenants at will. Later, on 12 January 1539, the college leased the same parcel to another man, named Heydon, for a period of eighty years, in return for rents equal to the traditional rent for the components of the parcel.

Less than a year after the parcel had been leased to Heydon, on 28 June 1539, Parliament enacted the Suppression of Religious Houses Act 1539 (31 Hen. 8. c. 13) – the "Act of Dissolution". The statute had the effect of dissolving many religious colleges, including Ottery College, which lost its lands and rents to Henry VIII. However, a provision in the act kept in force, for a term of life, any grants that had been made more than a year before the enactment of the statute.

The Court of Exchequer found that the grant to the Wares was protected by the relevant provision of the Act of Dissolution, but that the lease to Heydon was void.

== Significance of the case ==
The ruling was based on an important discussion of the relationship of a statute to the pre-existing common law. The court concluded that the purpose of the statute was to cure a mischief resulting from a defect in the common law. Therefore, the court concluded, the remedy of the statute was limited to curing that defect. Judges are supposed to construe statutes by seeking the true intent of the makers of the act, which is presumed to be pro bono publico, or intent for the public good.

Lord Coke described the process through which the court must interpret legislation:

For the sure and true interpretation of all statutes in general (be they penal or beneficial, restrictive or enlarging of the common law), four things are to be discerned and considered:

- (1st). What was the common law before the making of the Act?
- (2nd). What was the mischief and defect for which the common law did not provide.
- (3rd). What remedy the Parliament hath resolved and appointed to cure the disease of the commonwealth. And,
- (4th). The true reason of the remedy; and then the office of all the judges is always to make such construction as shall suppress the mischief, and advance the remedy, and to suppress subtle inventions and evasions for continuance of the mischief, and pro privato commodo, and to add force and life to the cure and remedy, according to the true intent of the makers of the Act, pro bono publico.

== See also ==
- Constitution of the United Kingdom
- Common law
- Re Spectrum Plus Ltd
- AG of Belize v Belize Telecom
