= Plain meaning rule =

Traditional rule of statutory interpretation in English law

The plain meaning rule, also known as the literal rule, is one of three rules of statutory construction traditionally applied by English courts. The other two are the "mischief rule" and the "golden rule".

The plain meaning rule dictates that statutes are to be interpreted using the ordinary meaning of the language of the statute. In other words, a statute is to be read word for word and is to be interpreted according to the ordinary meaning of the language, unless a statute explicitly defines some of its terms otherwise or unless the result would be cruel or absurd. Ordinary words are given their ordinary meaning, technical terms are given their technical meaning, and local, cultural terms are recognized as applicable. The plain meaning rule is the mechanism that prevents courts from taking sides in legislative or political issues. Additionally, it is the mechanism that underlies textualism and, to a certain extent, originalism.

== Meaning ==
To avoid ambiguity, legislatures often include "definitions" sections within a statute, which explicitly define the most important terms used in that statute. But some statutes omit a definitions section entirely, or (more commonly) fail to define a particular term. The plain meaning rule attempts to guide courts faced with litigation that turns on the meaning of a term not defined by the statute, or on that of a word found within a definition itself.

According to the plain meaning rule, absent a contrary definition within the statute, words must be given their plain, ordinary and literal meaning. If the words are clear, they must be applied, even though the intention of the legislator may have been different or the result is harsh or undesirable. The literal rule is what the law says instead of what the law was intended to say.

Larry Solum, Professor of Law at Georgetown University, expands on this premise:

Some laws are meant for all citizens (e.g., criminal statutes) and some are meant only for specialists (e.g., some sections of the tax code). A text that means one thing in a legal context, might mean something else if it were in a technical manual or a novel. So the plain meaning of a legal text is something like the meaning that would be understood by competent speakers of the natural language in which the text was written who are within the intended readership of the text and who understand that the text is a legal text of a certain type.

=== Soft plain meaning rule ===
Justices normally impose an absurdity limit on this rule, which states that a statute cannot be interpreted literally if it would lead to an absurd result. In the US Supreme Court Chung Fook v. White (1924) marked the beginning of the looser American Rule that the intent of the law was more important than its text.

This is sometimes termed the soft plain meaning rule, where the statute is interpreted according to the ordinary meaning of the language, unless the result would be cruel or absurd. For example, see Rector, Holy Trinity Church v. United States, 143 U.S. 457 (1892). Even the most vocal supporters of textualism and the plain meaning rule have been willing to commute "strict" plain meaning to "soft" plain meaning to a certain extent, in some circumstances; see, e.g. United States v. X-Citement Video, 513 U.S. 64 (1994) (Scalia, J., dissenting):

I have been willing, in the case of civil statutes, to acknowledge a doctrine of "scrivener's error" that permits a court to give an unusual (though not unheard-of) meaning to a word which, if given its normal meaning, would produce an absurd and arguably unconstitutional result.

In the United Kingdom, this is referred to as the golden rule.

== Reasons favoured ==
Proponents of the plain meaning rule claim that it prevents courts from taking sides in legislative or political issues. They also point out that ordinary people and lawyers do not have extensive access to secondary sources.

In probate law, the rule is also favored because the testator is typically not around to indicate what interpretation of a will is appropriate. Therefore, it is argued, extrinsic evidence should not be allowed to vary the words used by the testator or their meaning. It can help to provide for consistency in interpretation.

== Criticism ==
This is the oldest of the rules of construction and is still used today, primarily because judges may not legislate. As there is always the danger that a particular interpretation may be the equivalent of making law, some judges prefer to adhere to the law's literal wording.

Opponents of the plain meaning rule claim that the rule rests on the erroneous assumption that words have a fixed meaning. In fact, words are imprecise, leading justices to impose their own prejudices to determine the meaning of a statute.

=== Doctrine of absurdity ===
In law, strictly literal interpretations of statutes can lead to seemingly absurd results. The doctrine of absurdity holds that commonsense interpretations should be preferred in such cases, rather than literal readings. Under the absurdity doctrine, American courts have interpreted statutes contrary to their plain meaning in order to avoid absurd legal conclusions. It is contrasted with literalism.

The common sense of man approves the judgment mentioned by Pufendorf [sic. Puffendorf], that the Bolognian law which enacted "that whoever drew blood in the streets should be punished with the utmost severity", did not extend to the surgeon who opened the vein of a person that fell down in the street in a fit. The same common sense accepts the ruling, cited by Plowden, that the statute of [1st] Edward II, which enacts that a prisoner who breaks prison shall be guilty of a felony, does not extend to a prisoner who breaks out when the prison is on fire – "for he is not to be hanged because he would not stay to be burnt".

== English law history ==
An explanation of the rule was given in the Sussex Peerage Case (1844; 11 Cl&Fin 85). "The only rule for construction of Acts of Parliament is that they should be construed according to the intent of the Parliament which passed the Act. If the words of the Statute are in themselves precise and unambiguous, then no more can be necessary than to expound those words in that natural and ordinary sense. The words themselves alone do, in such a case, best declare the intention of the law giver."

However, use of the literal rule may defeat the intention of Parliament. For instance, in the case of Whiteley v. Chappel, the court came to the reluctant conclusion that Whiteley could not be convicted of impersonating "any person entitled to vote" at an election, because the person he impersonated was dead. Using a literal construction of the relevant statutory provision, the deceased was not "a person entitled to vote".

This, surely, cannot have been the intention of Parliament. However, the literal rule does not take into account the consequences of a literal interpretation, only whether words have a clear meaning that makes sense within that context. If Parliament does not like the literal interpretation, then it must amend the legislation.

== Other uses ==
The "plain meaning rule" has sometimes been applied to the interpretation of contracts, particularly in conjunction with the parol evidence rule. Such a use is controversial.

== See also ==
- Legal formalism
- Letter and spirit of the law § See also
- Pepper v. Hart [1993] AC 573
- Caminetti v. United States, 242 U.S. 470 (1917),
- Chung Fook v. White, 264 U.S. 443 (1924)
- Nix v. Hedden, 149 U.S. 304 (1893)
- United States v. Kirby, 74 U.S. 482 (1868)
- Textualism
- Bright-line rule
