= Mischief rule =

English rule of statutory interpretation

The mischief rule is one of three rules of statutory interpretation traditionally applied by English courts, (Note: "The notion has long prevailed that three different rules or approaches may be employed in ascertaining the meaning of a statute. First, there is said to be the "purpose" approach or "mischief rule"... Then there is said to be the "literal" approach or "plain meaning" rule... Finally there is what is called the "golden rule"...) the other two being the "plain meaning rule" (also known as the "literal rule") and the "golden rule". It is used to determine the exact scope of the "mischief" that the statute in question has set out to remedy, and to guide the court in ruling in a manner which will "suppress the mischief, and advance the remedy".

The rule considers not only the exact wording of the statute, but also the legislators' intentions in enacting it. In applying the rule, the court is essentially asking whether Parliament in enacting the statute intended to rectify a particular mischief, even though it might not be covered by a literal reading of the statute's wording. For example, if a law prohibits a specific behaviour "in the street", the legislators might – or might not – have intended the same behaviour on a first-floor balcony overlooking the roadway to be covered.

The rule was first set out in Heydon's Case, a 1584 ruling of the Exchequer Court.

== Meaning and use ==
In Conway v Rimmer it was observed that judges can apply in statutory interpretation in order to discover Parliament's intention. In applying the rule, the court is essentially asking what the mischief was that the previous law did not cover, which Parliament was seeking to remedy when it passed the law now being reviewed by the court.

The mischief rule is of narrower application than the golden rule or the plain meaning rule, in that it can only be used to interpret a statute and, strictly speaking, only when the statute was passed to remedy a defect in the common law.

Legislative intent is determined by examining secondary sources, such as committee reports, treatises, law review articles and corresponding statutes.

The application of this rule gives the judge more discretion than the literal and the golden rule as it allows Parliament's intent to be taken into consideration.

That the mischief rule can produce different outcomes than those that would result if the literal rule were applied is illustrated by Smith v Hughes [1960] 2 All ER 859. Under the Street Offences Act 1959, it was a crime for prostitutes to "loiter or solicit in the street for the purposes of prostitution". The defendants were calling to men in the street from balconies and tapping on windows. They argued that as they were not themselves "in the street" they fell outside the definition. The judge held that as the intention of the act was to cover the mischief of harassment from prostitutes, the quoted wording did apply, and the defendants were found guilty.

== History ==
The rule was first set out in Heydon's Case [1584] 76 ER 637 3 Co Rep 7a, where the court held that four points should be taken into consideration:

For the sure and true interpretation of all statutes in general (be they penal or beneficial, restrictive or enlarging of the common law), four things are to be discerned and considered:

1st. What was the common law before the making of the Act.

2nd. What was the mischief and defect for which the common law did not provide.

3rd. What remedy the Parliament hath resolved and appointed to cure the disease of the commonwealth.

And, 4th. The true reason of the remedy;

And then the office of all the Judges is to make such construction as shall suppress the mischief, and advance the remedy, and to suppress subtle inventions and evasions for continuance of the mischief, and pro privato commodo, and to add force and life to the cure and remedy, according to the true intent of the makers of the Act, pro bono publico.

== Original use ==
In the century in which it was created, and for some time thereafter, the mischief rule was used in a legislative environment very different from the one which has prevailed in the past two centuries. As Elmer Driedger notes, 16th century common law judges looked upon statutes as a gloss upon the common law, even as an intrusion into their domain. Hence, statutes were viewed from the point of view of their effect upon the common law, as adding to it, subtracting from it or patching it up. Then also, in the time of Heydon's Case, the judges paid more attention to the "spirit" of the law than to the letter. Having found the mischief they proceeded to make mischief with the words of the statute. They remodelled the statute, by taking things out and putting things in, in order to fit the "mischief" and "defect" as they had found them.

== Modern use ==
Modern courts apply the rule in a more restricted manner, and with a greater regard for the integrity of the statutes which they are interpreting. Driedger (1983) puts it this way:

"[T]o this day, Heydon's Case is frequently cited. The courts still look for the 'mischief' and 'remedy', but now use what they find as aids to discover the meaning of what the legislature has said rather than to change it".

Driedger goes on to argue that this modern use of the mischief rule ought to be understood as one of the components of what he characterized as the "modern" method of statutory construction, rather than a stand-alone rule serving (as it formerly had), as an alternative to the methods of construction proposed by the plain meaning rule and the golden rule.

== See also ==
- Letter and spirit of the law
- Pepper (Inspector of Taxes) v Hart

== Bibliography ==
- Driedger, Elmer (1983). The Construction of Statutes (2nd ed.). Toronto: Butterworths.
