= Golden rule (law) =

English rule of statutory interpretation

The golden rule in English law is one of the rules of statutory construction traditionally applied by the English courts. The rule can be used to avoid the consequences of a literal interpretation of the wording of a statute when such an interpretation would lead to a manifest absurdity or to a result that is contrary to principles of public policy. The rule can be applied in two different ways, named respectively the narrow approach and the broad approach.

== Meaning ==
The golden rule arises out of two fundamental principles: that courts must interpret statute "according to the intent of them that made it", and that "the words of the statute speak the intention of the Legislature". As a result, the text of the statute as a whole provides the context in which a given provision should be interpreted when resolving textual difficulties. This was first articulated by Burton J in the Irish case of Warburton v Loveland in 1828:

I understand that this is a rule in the construction of methods, in the first case, the grammatical meaning of the words must be followed. If it contradicts or is inconsistent with the stated purpose, or contradicts the stated purpose of the statute, or contains any negligence, retaliation, or inconsistency, the grammatical meaning should be modified, expanded, or abbreviated. This kind of discomfort, but not anymore.

This was affirmed by the House of Lords in 1832. Citing Warburton in the 1836 English case of Becke v Smith, James Parke (1st Baron Wensleydale, later Lord Wensleydale) stated:

It is a very useful rule, in the construction of a statute, to adhere to the ordinary meaning of the words used, and to the grammatical construction, unless that is at variance with the intention of the legislature, to be collected from the statute itself, or leads to any manifest absurdity or repugnance, in which case the language may be varied or modified, so as to avoid such inconvenience, but no further.

Twenty-one years later, in 1857, Lord Wensleydale again restated the rule in different words in the House of Lords case Grey v Pearson:

I have been long and deeply impressed with the wisdom of the rule, now, I believe, universally adopted, at least in the Courts of Law in Westminster Hall, that in construing wills and indeed statutes, and all written instruments, the grammatical and ordinary sense of the words is to be adhered to, unless that would lead to some absurdity, or some repugnance or inconsistency with the rest of the instrument, in which case the grammatical and ordinary sense of the words may be modified, so as to avoid that absurdity and inconsistency, but no farther.

== Narrow approach ==
The rule may be applied in the narrow sense where there is some ambiguity or absurdity in the words themselves.

In the leading case of R v Allen from 1872, the defendant was charged with bigamy under section 57 of the Offences against the Person Act 1861 which made it an offence to marry while one's spouse is still alive and not divorced. The court held that the word "marry" could not in that context mean "become legally married" since that could never apply to someone who is already married to someone else. To make sense of the provision, the word should be interpreted as meaning to "go through a second ceremony of marriage".

== Broad approach ==
In its broad sense, the rule may be used to avoid a result that is contrary to principles of public policy, even where words may prima facie carry only one meaning.

The rule was applied in this sense in Re Sigsworth in 1935, in the context of the Administration of Estates Act 1925. A man had murdered his mother and then committed suicide. Under the plain terms of section 46, as the woman had died intestate her murderer stood to inherit substantially her entire estate, which would then have passed to his descendants. This was challenged by other members of the woman's family. The court used the golden rule to find in favour of the family members, preventing the son's descendants as a matter of public policy from profiting from his crime. The rule as applied in that particular case has subsequently been put onto a statutory footing in the Forfeiture Act 1982 and the Estates of Deceased Persons (Forfeiture Rule and Law of Succession) Act 2011.

The leading case on the broad approach is Adler v George from 1964, in which the defendant was charged with obstructing a military guard in the execution of his duty. To succeed, the prosecution had to show that the act took place "in the vicinity of" a military establishment. The defendant argued that "in the vicinity" meant "outside or in the proximity or area" of the establishment, whereas he was inside the establishment, specifically RAF Marham. The court decided that such an interpretation would lead to an absurd result, and interpreted "in the vicinity of" to cover a person already on the premises.

== See also ==
- Mischief rule
- Heydon's Case
- Purposive approach
