= West South Central states =

U.S. Census Bureau region

Coordinates: 33°N 94°W

West South Central
- Region
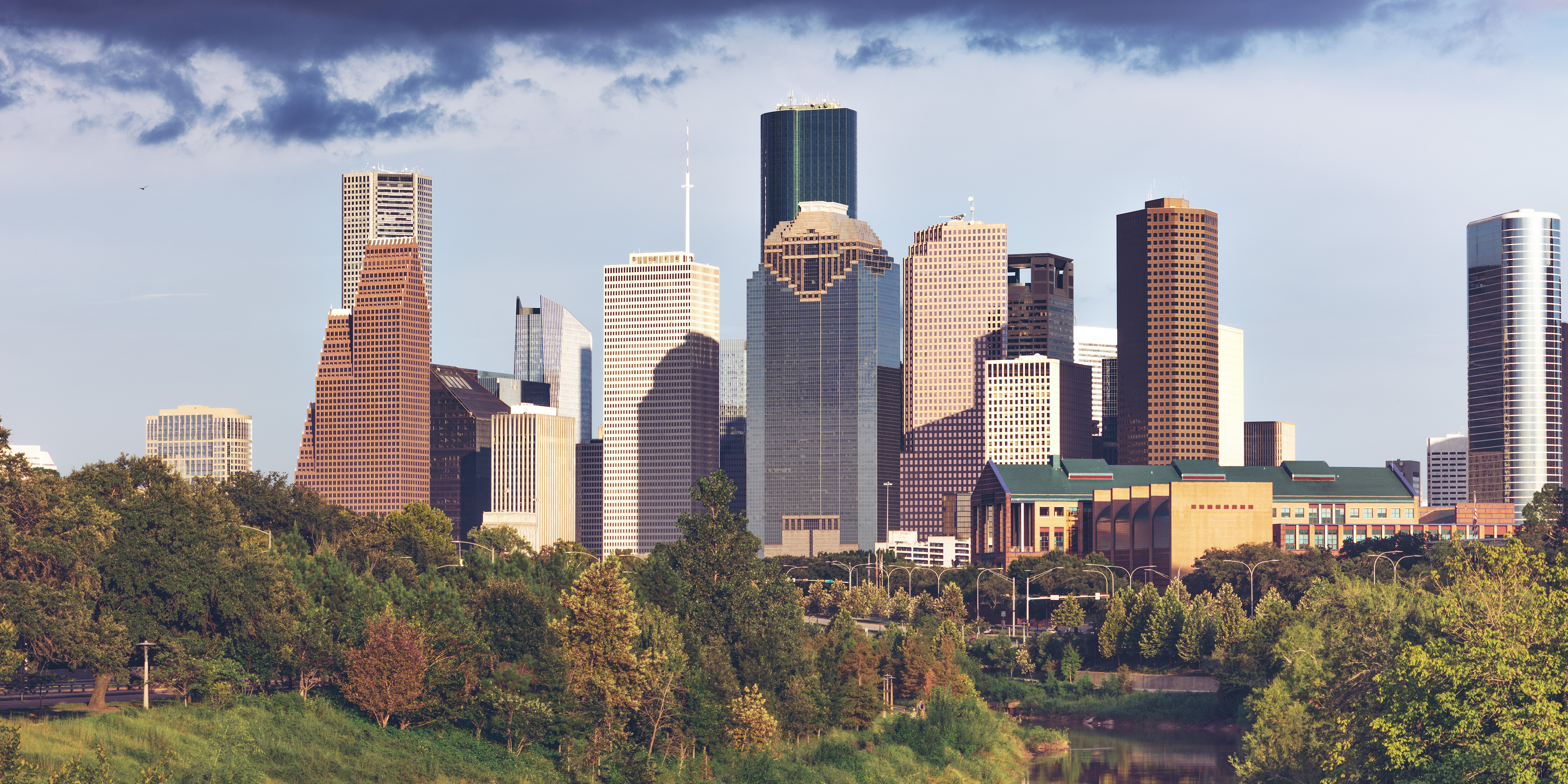
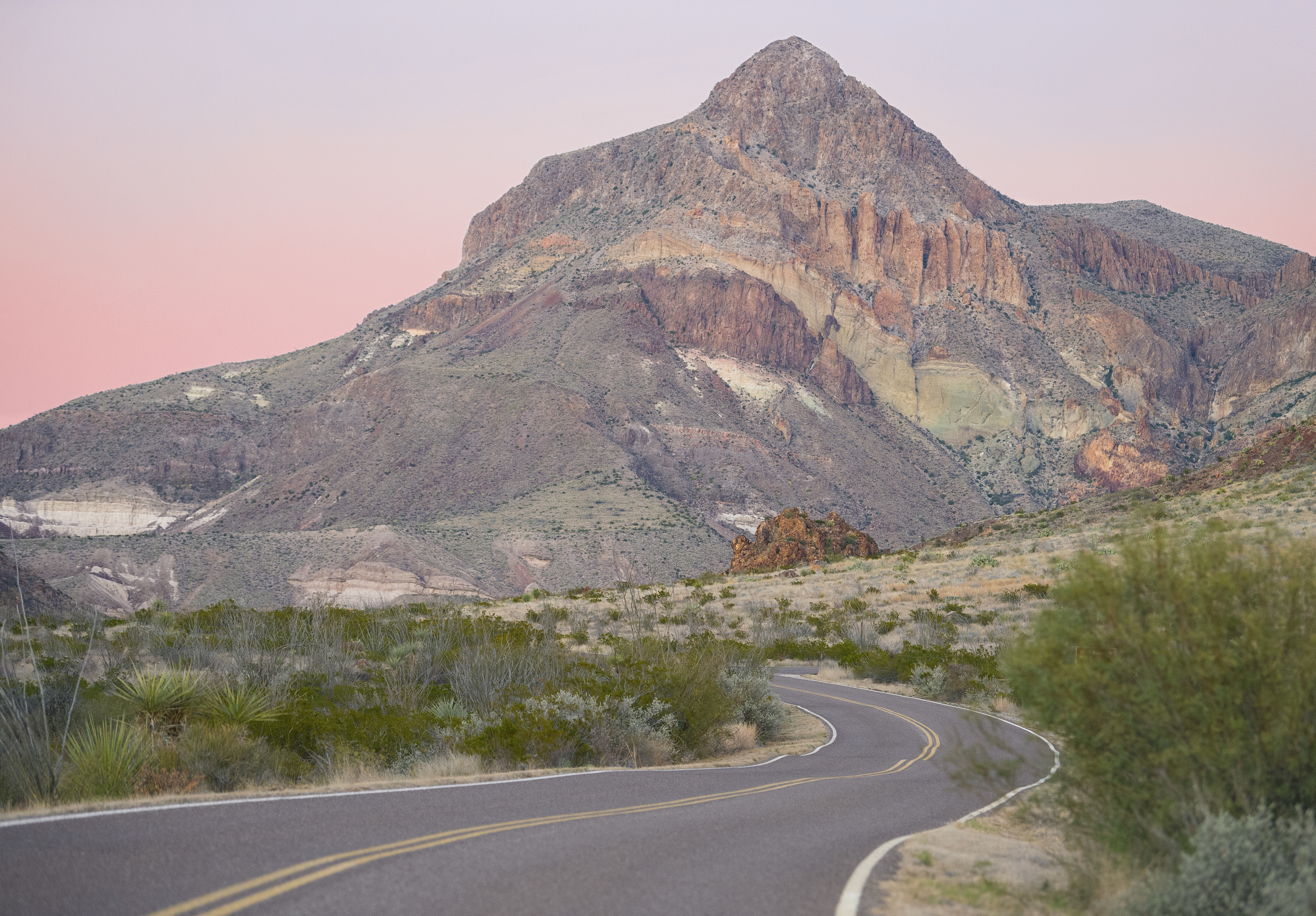
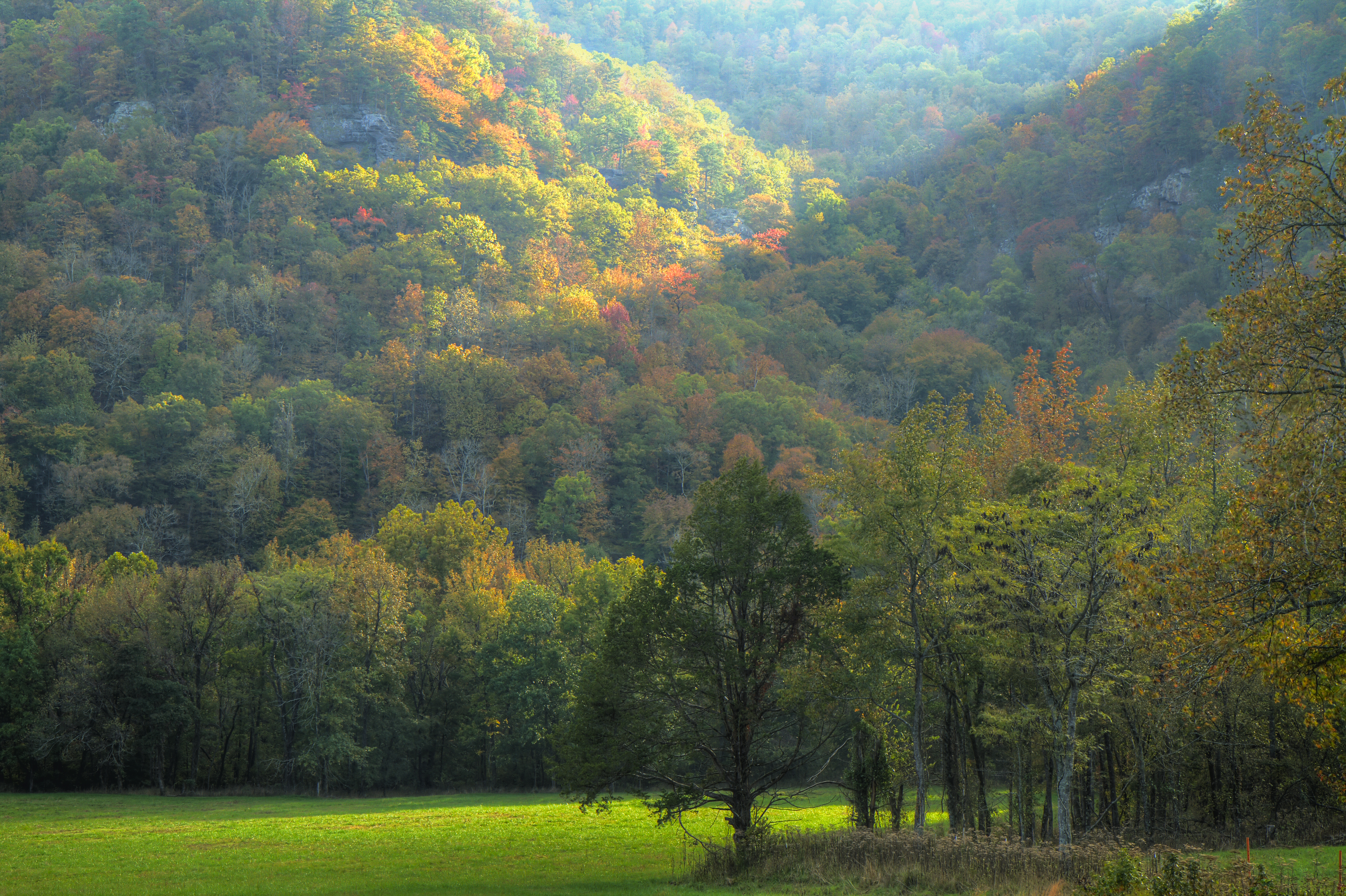
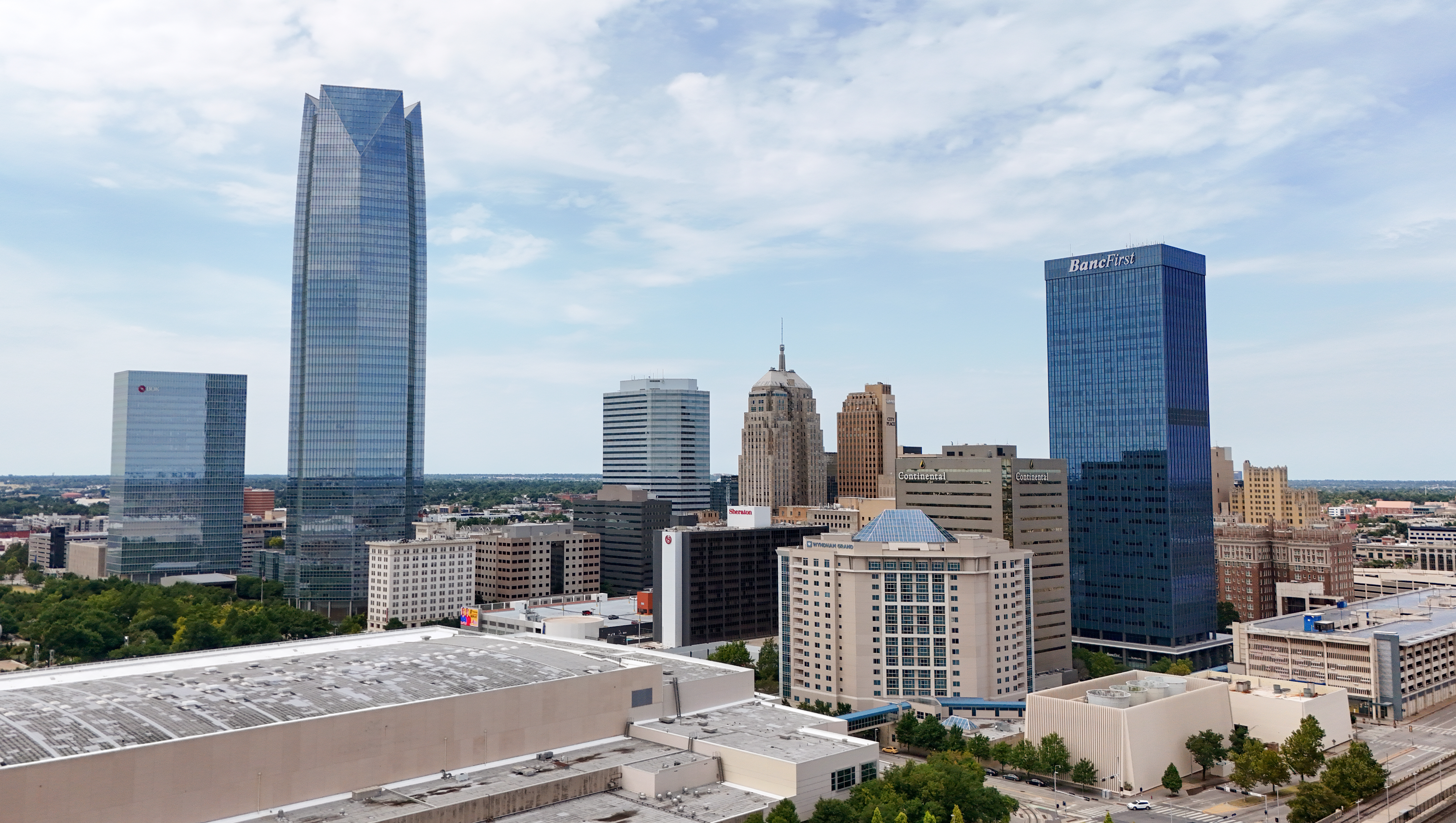
- Houston Fort Gibson Little Rock Central High School Jackson Square Big Bend National Park Autumn in the Ozarks Oklahoma City

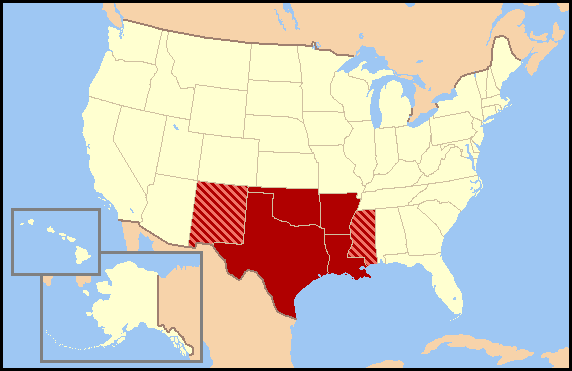
- States in dark red are traditionally included in the West South Central states, while states shown in stripes may be broadly included, although they form part of the Mountain states and East South Central states regions.
- States: Arkansas; Louisiana; Oklahoma; Texas
- Largest metropolitan areas: Dallas–Fort Worth; Greater Houston; Greater San Antonio; Greater Austin; Oklahoma metroplex; Greater New Orleans
- Largest city: Houston

Area
  - Total: 444,052.01 sq mi (1,150,089.4 km^{2})
  - Land: 425,066.01 sq mi (1,100,915.9 km^{2})
  - Water: 18,986.00 sq mi (49,173.5 km^{2})

Population (2019)
  - Total: 40,619,450
  - Density: 95.56033/sq mi (36.89605/km^{2})

The West South Central states, colloquially known as the South Central states, is a region of the United States defined by the U.S. Census Bureau as covering four states: Arkansas, Louisiana, Oklahoma, and Texas. The West South Central or South Central region is located within the Southern United States and Gulf Coast regions, bordering the Mountain states and Midwestern U.S. regions to its north and west. The Gulf of Mexico is to the south of the region. Houston is the South Central's largest city, and the Dallas–Fort Worth–Arlington metropolitan statistical area is the region's largest metropolis.

A geographically diverse region, the southern portion of the states are covered by coastal plains and swamps, while the remainder is covered by forests such as the Cross Timbers, hills and mountains, and deserts near the Texas–Mexico border.

With European colonization of the Americas, this region of the U.S. has been heavily influenced by the French and Spanish. With American settlement, Anglo-American culture began to influence the states covering the region. Distinct from New England and the Mid-Atlantic states, and in common with the Western U.S. and South Atlantic states, the majority of its non-Anglo culture descends from the Spanish Empire and Mexico; within Louisiana, there is a significant French influence preserved through its Cajun and Louisiana Creole populations. In Oklahoma, Native American culture is prevalent through tribes such as the Cherokee and Seminole nations among others.

Within the region, Christianity is the prevalent religion as part of the Bible Belt; southern and southeastern Texas and southern Louisiana are predominantly Roman Catholic and non- or inter-denominational Protestant, with Baptists constituting a great majority. From central and northern Texas, and central and northern Louisiana to the states of Oklahoma and Arkansas, Baptists, Methodists, and non- or inter-denominational Protestants constitute the majority.

== History ==
The history of the West South Central states is dominated by the conflict and interaction between three cultural-linguistic groups: the Anglosphere (first Great Britain and then the United States), the Hispanidad (first Spain then Mexico), and the Francophonie (France).

In the 17th and 18th centuries, Spain and France maneuvered for control of Texas, with the Spanish based in Mexico and the French in Louisiana. During the War of the Quadruple Alliance hostilities spread to the New World and the French troops from Natchitoches briefly captured the capital of Spanish Texas, Los Adaes, in what is now western Louisiana. The French were not able to wrest control of Texas from Spain, and by the early 19th century sold their North American holdings to the United States in the Louisiana Purchase, which comprised slightly less than half of what is today the West South Central United States.

During the Texas Revolution (1835–1836), a rebellion of United States immigrants and Tejanos (Texas Mexicans), put up armed resistance against the Centralist Republic of Mexico. The Battle of the Alamo was a major turning point during the Texas Revolution. This battle would lead to many Texians deciding to join the Texian Army. Texians would defeat the Mexican Army at the Battle of San Jacinto later on, leading to Texas declaring themselves an independent country in 1836, however Mexico viewed them as a rebellious province. Texas would eventually be admitted as a U.S. state in 1845.

The official West and East South Central states of Texas, Arkansas, Louisiana, Mississippi, Alabama, and Tennessee would secede from the Union and join the Confederacy during the American Civil War. Kentucky was a border state that remained with the Union. Oklahoma, although Indian Territory at the time, was home to five major Native American tribes (the Five Civilized Tribes), of which the majority allied themselves with the Confederacy. Oklahoma Territory and Indian Territory would merge into the state of Oklahoma when it became the 46th U.S. state in 1907. All of these states are usually considered to make up a larger part of the American South, both historically and culturally, as well as classified by the U.S. Census Bureau.

== Geography ==
The climate varies from the semi-tropical in the Mississippi Delta, south Louisiana, and southeast Texas, to the dry Chihuahuan desert in West Texas. A large portion of the northeastern quarter of the region is mountainous, with the Ozark and Ouachita mountains of Arkansas and eastern Oklahoma. The northwest quarter of the region is dominated by the Great Plains which become progressively drier west of 100° W, forming the North American Llano Estacado. The southwestern portions border the Rio Grande and are generally drier than other areas of the West South Central United States.

Two megaregions exist within this region:

- The Texas Triangle is formed by interstates 10, 35, and 45 connecting in the shape of a triangle to link the four metropolitan areas of Dallas/Fort Worth, Houston, San Antonio, and Austin.
- The Gulf Coast megaregion is located along the shores of the Gulf of Mexico and primarily along the I-10 corridor centered upon the urban areas of Houston and New Orleans, this megaregion extends into the southeastern region.

States in the West South Central region
State	Population (2020 census)	Land area (sq mi)
Arkansas	3,011,524	53,179
Louisiana	4,657,757	51,843
Oklahoma	3,986,639	69,898
Texas	29,527,941	268,581

== Demographics ==
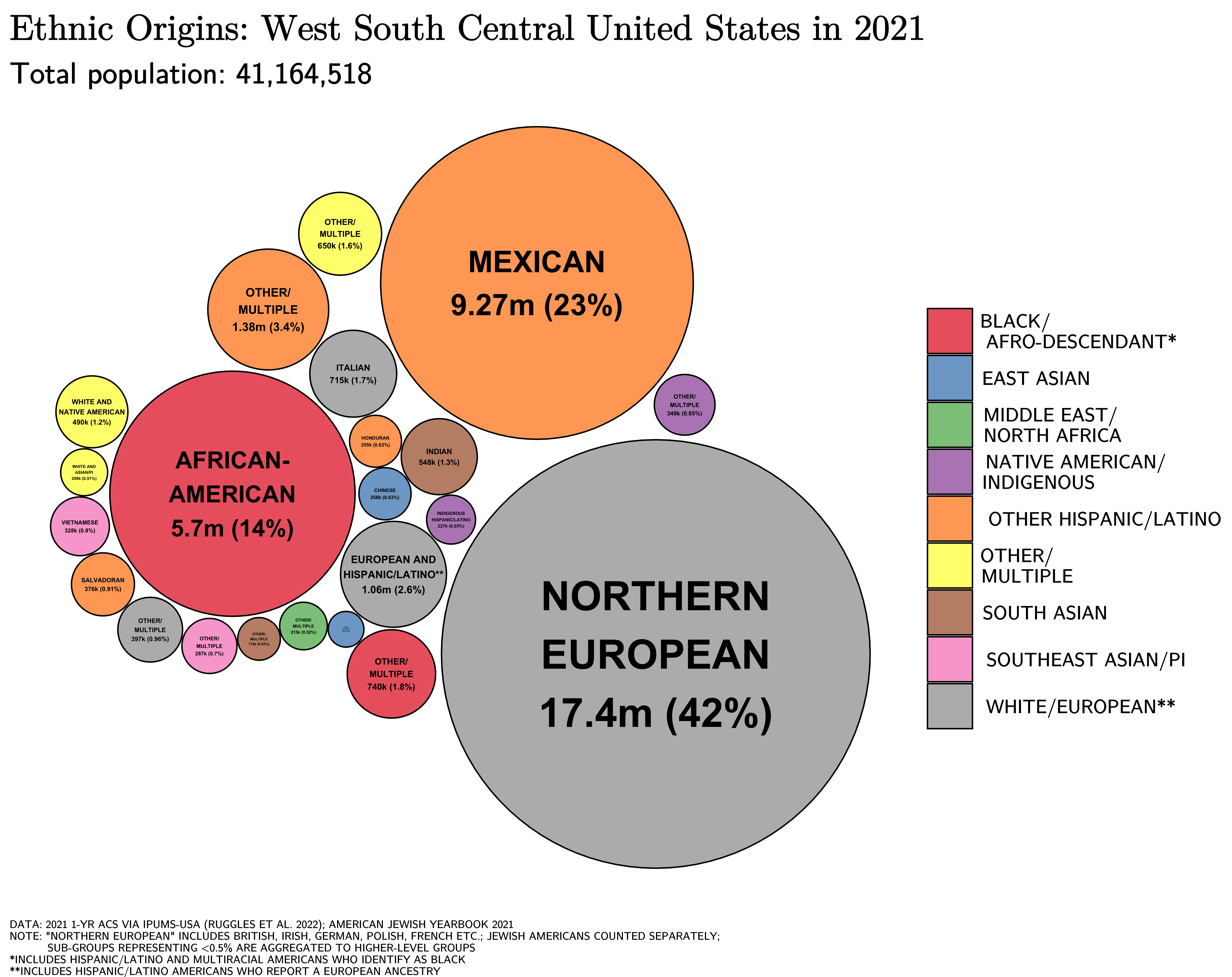
Ethnic origins in West South Central (4 states)

Texas is the largest West South Central state by both area and population; Texas is still home to over half the region's population. The largest city in the region, Houston, is located in Texas. New Orleans was tied with Oklahoma City in population but, after Hurricane Katrina, the population of the New Orleans metro area declined to approximately 1 million. By 2017, the population of the New Orleans metropolitan area had bounced back to almost 1.3 million; overall, Louisiana and Arkansas are the two-slowest growing states of the region in contrast with Texas and Oklahoma. In contrast with the population growth of Texas, Oklahoma, and Arkansas, Louisiana has experienced the fifth highest population loss in the U.S. according to 2021 census estimates (making it the second-slowest growing state along the entire Gulf Coast megaregion, yet still experiencing more natural births than Mississippi in the East South Central states).

Ten largest cities by population
	City	2024 pop.
1	Houston, Texas	2,390,125
2	San Antonio, Texas	1,526,656
3	Dallas, Texas	1,326,087
4	Fort Worth, Texas	1,008,106
5	Austin, Texas	993,588
6	Oklahoma City, Oklahoma	712,919
7	El Paso, Texas	681,723
8	Tulsa, Oklahoma	415,154
9	Arlington, Texas	403,672
10	New Orleans, Louisiana	362,701

Twelve largest metropolitan areas by population
	MSA	2024 pop.
1	Dallas–Fort Worth–Arlington, TX MSA	8,344,032
2	Houston-The Woodlands-Sugar Land, TX MSA	7,796,182
3	San Antonio-New Braunfels, TX MSA	2,763,006
4	Austin-Round Rock-San Marcos, TX MSA	2,550,637
5	Oklahoma City, OK MSA	1,497,821
6	Tulsa, OK MSA	1,059,803
7	New Orleans-Metairie, LA MSA	966,230
8	McAllen-Edinburg-Mission, TX MSA	914,820
9	Baton Rouge, LA MSA	882,652
10	El Paso, TX MSA	879,392
11	Little Rock–North Little Rock–Conway, AR MSA	769,258
12	Fayetteville–Springdale–Rogers, AR MSA	605,615

== Politics ==
Parties
Democratic-Republican	Democratic	Whig	Republican	Dixiecrat	American Independent

- **Bold** denotes election winner.

Presidential electoral votes in the West South Central States since 1812
Year	Arkansas	Louisiana	Oklahoma	Texas
1812	No election	**Madison**	No election	No election
1816	No election	**Monroe**	No election	No election
1820	No election	**Monroe**	No election	No election
1824	No election	Jackson	No election	No election
1828	No election	**Jackson**	No election	No election
1832	No election	**Jackson**	No election	No election
1836	**Van Buren**	**Van Buren**	No election	No election
1840	Van Buren	**Harrison**	No election	No election
1844	**Polk**	**Polk**	No election	No election
1848	Cass	**Taylor**	No election	Cass
1852	**Pierce**	**Pierce**	No election	**Pierce**
1856	**Buchanan**	**Buchanan**	No election	**Buchanan**
1860	Breckinridge	Breckinridge	No election	Breckinridge
1864	No election	**Lincoln**	No election	No election
1868	**Grant**	Seymour	No election	No election
1872	**Grant**	**Grant**	No election	Hendricks
1876	Tilden	**Hayes**	No election	Tilden
1880	Hancock	Hancock	No election	Hancock
1884	**Cleveland**	**Cleveland**	No election	**Cleveland**
1888	Cleveland	Cleveland	No election	Cleveland
1892	**Cleveland**	**Cleveland**	No election	**Cleveland**
1896	Bryan	Bryan	No election	Bryan
1900	Bryan	Bryan	No election	Bryan
1904	Parker	Parker	No election	Parker
1908	Bryan	Bryan	Bryan	Bryan
1912	**Wilson**	**Wilson**	**Wilson**	**Wilson**
1916	**Wilson**	**Wilson**	**Wilson**	**Wilson**
1920	Cox	Cox	**Harding**	Cox
1924	Davis	Davis	Davis	Davis
1928	Smith	Smith	**Hoover**	**Hoover**
1932	**Roosevelt**	**Roosevelt**	**Roosevelt**	**Roosevelt**
1936	**Roosevelt**	**Roosevelt**	**Roosevelt**	**Roosevelt**
1940	**Roosevelt**	**Roosevelt**	**Roosevelt**	**Roosevelt**
1944	**Roosevelt**	**Roosevelt**	**Roosevelt**	**Roosevelt**
1948	**Truman**	Thurmond	**Truman**	**Truman**
1952	Stevenson	Stevenson	**Eisenhower**	**Eisenhower**
1956	Stevenson	**Eisenhower**	**Eisenhower**	**Eisenhower**
1960	**Kennedy**	**Kennedy**	Nixon	**Kennedy**
1964	**Johnson**	Goldwater	**Johnson**	**Johnson**
1968	Wallace	Wallace	**Nixon**	Humphrey
1972	**Nixon**	**Nixon**	**Nixon**	**Nixon**
1976	**Carter**	**Carter**	Ford	**Carter**
1980	**Reagan**	**Reagan**	**Reagan**	**Reagan**
1984	**Reagan**	**Reagan**	**Reagan**	**Reagan**
1988	**Bush**	**Bush**	**Bush**	**Bush**
1992	**Clinton**	**Clinton**	Bush	Bush
1996	**Clinton**	**Clinton**	Dole	Dole
2000	**Bush**	**Bush**	**Bush**	**Bush**
2004	**Bush**	**Bush**	**Bush**	**Bush**
2008	McCain	McCain	McCain	McCain
2012	Romney	Romney	Romney	Romney
2016	**Trump**	**Trump**	**Trump**	**Trump**
2020	Trump	Trump	Trump	Trump
2024	**Trump**	**Trump**	**Trump**	**Trump**
Year	Arkansas	Louisiana	Oklahoma	Texas

== Sports ==
Within the major professional sports leagues in the United States and Canada, the first team in the region were founded in 1960: the Dallas Cowboys of the National Football League and the Houston Oilers of the American Football League. The Oilers relocated after 1996, whereas two more teams in the region joined the NFL: the Houston Texans (2002) and New Orleans Saints (1967).

Two Major League Baseball teams are based in the region: Houston Astros (1962) and Texas Rangers (1972). The region has five NBA teams: San Antonio Spurs (1967), Houston Rockets (1971), Dallas Mavericks (1980), New Orleans Pelicans (2002) and Oklahoma City Thunder (2008). National Hockey League features the Dallas Stars since 1993.

Texas also has three Major League Soccer teams: FC Dallas (1996), Houston Dynamo (2006), and Austin FC (2021), whereas the Dallas Tornado played in the North American Soccer League from 1968 to 1981.

Collegiate athletics have deep significance in the region's culture, especially football. The Southwest Conference was based in the region from 1914 to 1996. Currently the Big 12 Conference has four teams from Texas and one from Oklahoma, whereas the Southeastern Conference has two teams from Texas, one from Oklahoma, one from Arkansas, and one from Louisiana.

According to a survey of Division I-A coaches, the Red River Shootout, the rivalry between the Oklahoma Sooners and Texas Longhorns, ranks the third best in the nation. The Bedlam Series is the rivalry between the Oklahoma Sooners and Oklahoma State Cowboys. The TCU Horned Frogs and SMU Mustangs also share a rivalry and compete annually in the Battle for the Iron Skillet.

Major professional teams
Team	Sport	League	Venue
Austin FC	Soccer	MLS	Q2 Stadium
Dallas Cowboys	Football	NFL	AT&T Stadium
Dallas Mavericks	Basketball	NBA	American Airlines Center
Dallas Stars	Hockey	NHL	American Airlines Center
FC Dallas	Soccer	MLS	Toyota Stadium
Houston Astros	Baseball	MLB	Minute Maid Park
Houston Dynamo	Soccer	MLS	BBVA Stadium
Houston Rockets	Basketball	NBA	Toyota Center
Houston Texans	Football	NFL	NRG Stadium
New Orleans Pelicans	Basketball	NBA	Smoothie King Center
New Orleans Saints	Football	NFL	Mercedes-Benz Superdome
Oklahoma City Thunder	Basketball	NBA	Paycom Center
San Antonio Spurs	Basketball	NBA	AT&T Center
Texas Rangers	Baseball	MLB	Globe Life Field
