= Casey v The Master =

South African legal case

The facts of the case in Casey v The Master, an important case in the South African law of succession, the deceased and her husband were married in community of property and had a joint will, whereby both spouses bequeathed their half of the joint estate to each other. Being safety-conscious, each night the deceased's husband slept with a loaded revolver under his pillow. One night the revolver accidentally went off while the couple was sleeping; the bullet struck the deceased, who subsequently died. The deceased's husband was convicted of culpable homicide.

The legal question arose of whether or not someone who negligently killed another may inherit in terms of the deceased's will. The court found that the answer was 'no'.

In general terms anyone may benefit from a will, however, an exception is made in the Roman-Dutch law: the court held that the bloedige hand rule, which means that no one may benefit from the death of their own victim, still applies and has not become obsolete by disuse. Accordingly, the deceased's husband was not allowed to inherit but could take half of the common estate in terms of the matrimonial property law.

== See also ==
- South African law of succession
