= East South Central states =

Region of the United States

Coordinates: 36.0°N 88.0°W

East South Central
- Region
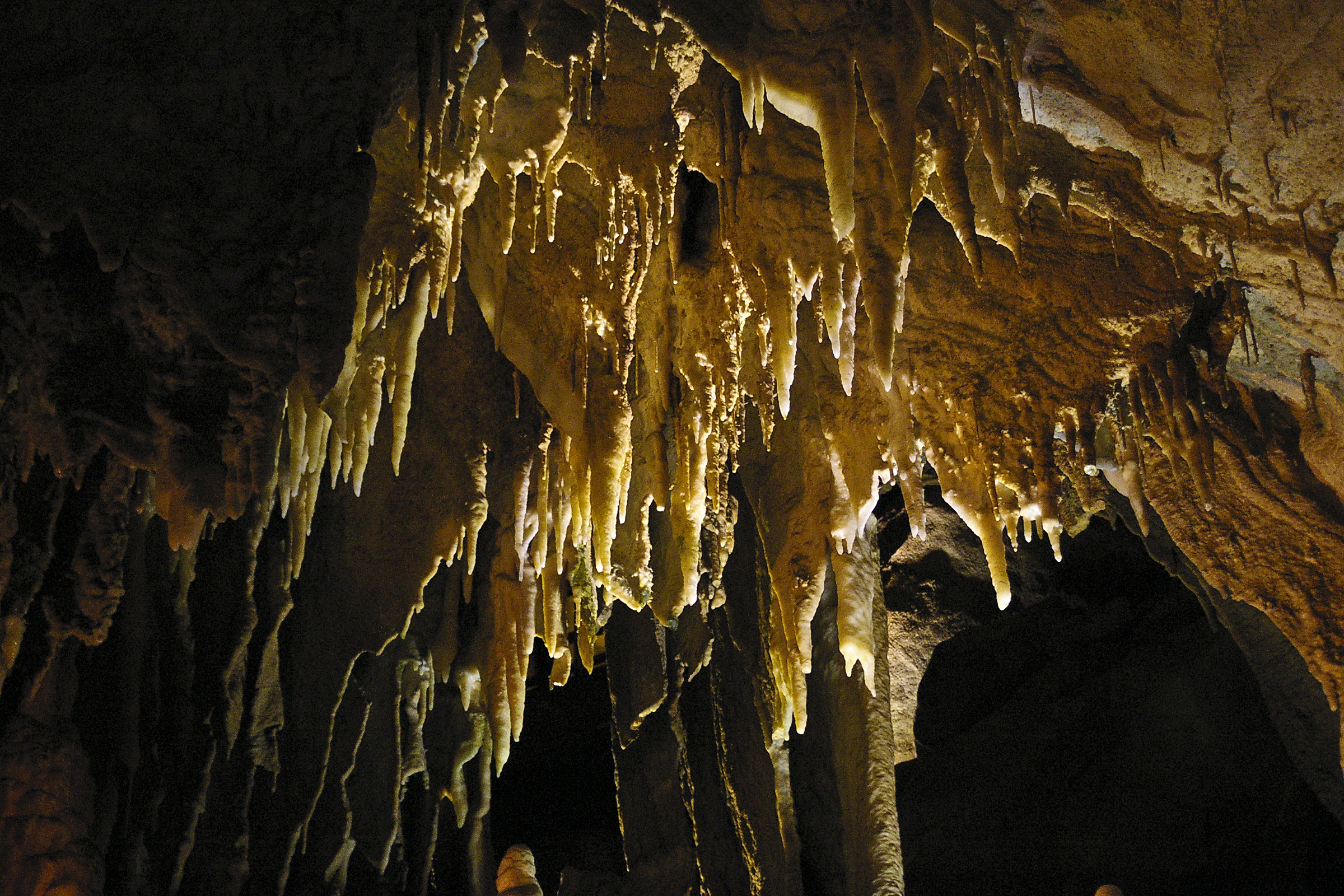
- Nashville Mammoth Cave Biloxi Beach Louisville Vicksburg National Military Park Little River Canyon U.S. Space & Rocket Center

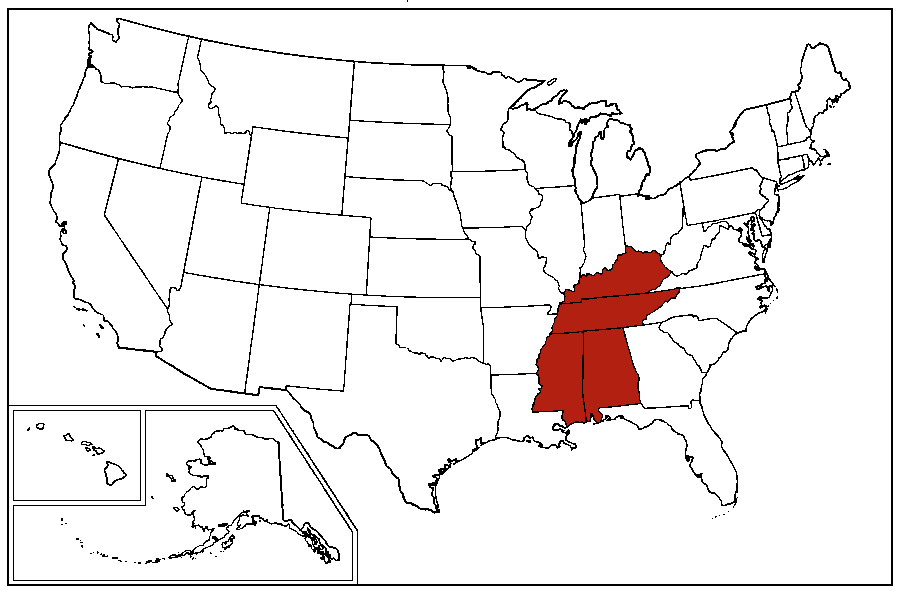
- States in dark red make up the East South Central states region
- Largest city: Nashville

Area
  - Total: 183,403.90 sq mi (475,013.9 km^{2})
  - Land: 178,289.84 sq mi (461,768.6 km^{2})
  - Water: 5,114.07 sq mi (13,245.4 km^{2})

Population (2019)
  - Total: 19,176,181
  - Density: 107.55622/sq mi (41.527688/km^{2})

The East South Central states is a region constituting one of the nine U.S. Census Bureau divisions. It is located within the American South. Four states make up the division: Kentucky, Tennessee, Mississippi and Alabama. The division is one of three that together make up the larger region known as the Southern United States (the other two are the more populous South Atlantic states and the West South Central states).

Historically, the area has been colonized and influenced by the French, Spanish, British, early American, and Confederate governments. Distinct among these states, Alabama's French culture has been preserved through the Alabama Creoles, and Kentucky's French culture can be observed throughout Louisville. The East South Central states form the core of Old Dixie, one of the nine moral regions identified by James Patterson and Peter Kim in their acclaimed 1991 geopolitical best-seller, The Day America Told The Truth. Politically and culturally, the East South Central is more conservative than the other regions making up the American South; Mississippi, Alabama, Kentucky, and Tennessee's governments have been described during 2012 to 2023 as some of the most conservative. Religiously, conservative Evangelical Protestantism dominates the East South Central as a central part of the Bible Belt.

== Demographics ==
As of 2020, the East South Central states had a combined population of 19,430,030. The East South Central region covers 183,401 square miles of land. Within the region, Tennessee is the largest state by population, though Alabama is the largest by land area; Tennessee was also the East South Central's fastest growing state between 2010 and 2020, with Alabama second. Kentucky was the third-fastest growing state, and Mississippi experienced population decline; despite population decline, Mississippi did increase in diversity.

States in the East South Central region
State	2020 estimate	Land area
Kentucky	4,509,342	40,409
Tennessee	6,916,897	42,143
Mississippi	2,963,914	48,430
Alabama	5,039,877	52,419

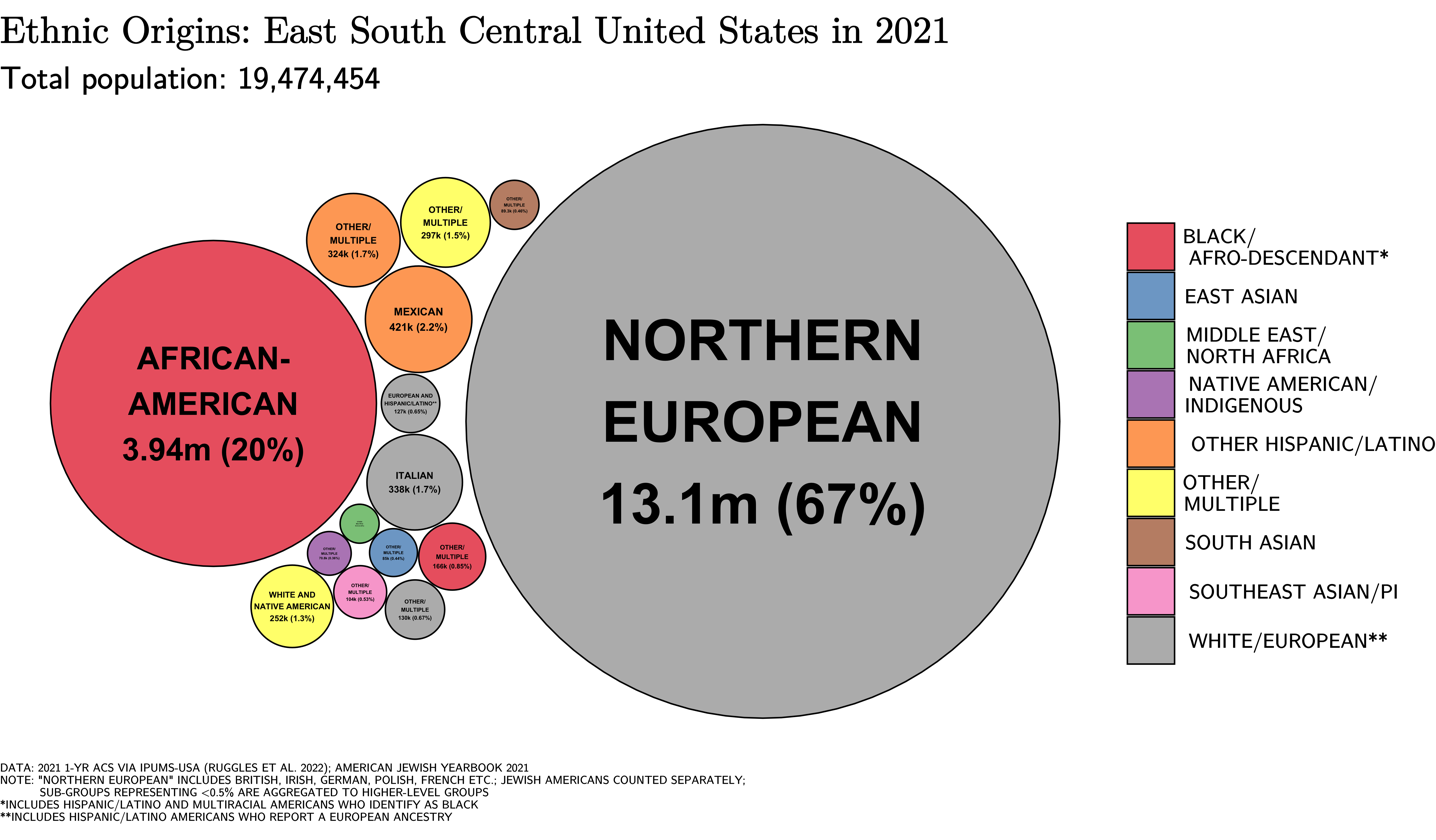
Ethnic origins in East South Central

Ten largest cities by population
	City	2020 pop.
1	Nashville, Tennessee	689,447
2	Memphis, Tennessee	633,104
3	Louisville, Kentucky	633,045
4	Lexington, Kentucky	322,707
5	Huntsville, Alabama	215,006
6	Birmingham, Alabama	200,733
7	Montgomery, Alabama	200,663
8	Knoxville, Tennessee	190,740
9	Mobile, Alabama	187,041
10	Chattanooga, Tennessee	181,009

== Politics ==
Parties
Nonpartisan	Democratic-Republican	Democratic	National Republican	Whig	Constitutional Union	Republican	Dixiecrat	American Independent

- **Bold** denotes election winner.

Presidential electoral votes in the East South Central States since 1792
Year	Alabama	Kentucky	Mississippi	Tennessee
1792	No election	**Washington**	No election	No election
1796	No election	Jefferson	No election	Jefferson
1800	No election	**Jefferson**	No election	**Jefferson**
1804	No election	**Jefferson**	No election	**Jefferson**
1808	No election	**Madison**	No election	**Madison**
1812	No election	**Madison**	No election	**Madison**
1816	No election	**Monroe**	No election	**Monroe**
1820	**Monroe**	**Monroe**	**Monroe**	**Monroe**
1824	Jackson	Clay	Jackson	Jackson
1828	**Jackson**	**Jackson**	**Jackson**	**Jackson**
1832	**Jackson**	Clay	**Jackson**	**Jackson**
1836	**Van Buren**	Harrison	**Van Buren**	White
1840	Van Buren	**Harrison**	**Harrison**	**Harrison**
1844	**Polk**	Clay	**Polk**	Clay
1848	Cass	**Taylor**	Cass	**Taylor**
1852	**Pierce**	Scott	**Pierce**	Scott
1856	**Buchanan**	**Buchanan**	**Buchanan**	**Buchanan**
1860	Breckinridge	Bell	Breckinridge	Bell
1864	No election	McClellan	No election	**Lincoln (rejected)**
1868	**Grant**	Seymour	No election	**Grant**
1872	**Grant**	Hendricks	**Grant**	Hendricks
1876	Tilden	Tilden	Tilden	Tilden
1880	Hancock	Hancock	Hancock	Hancock
1884	**Cleveland**	**Cleveland**	**Cleveland**	**Cleveland**
1888	Cleveland	Cleveland	Cleveland	Cleveland
1892	**Cleveland**	**Cleveland**	**Cleveland**	**Cleveland**
1896	Bryan	**McKinley**	Bryan	Bryan
1900	Bryan	Bryan	Bryan	Bryan
1904	Parker	Parker	Parker	Parker
1908	Bryan	Bryan	Bryan	Bryan
1912	**Wilson**	**Wilson**	**Wilson**	**Wilson**
1916	**Wilson**	**Wilson**	**Wilson**	**Wilson**
1920	Cox	Cox	Cox	**Harding**
1924	Davis	**Coolidge**	Davis	Davis
1928	Smith	**Hoover**	Smith	**Hoover**
1932	**Roosevelt**	**Roosevelt**	**Roosevelt**	**Roosevelt**
1936	**Roosevelt**	**Roosevelt**	**Roosevelt**	**Roosevelt**
1940	**Roosevelt**	**Roosevelt**	**Roosevelt**	**Roosevelt**
1944	**Roosevelt**	**Roosevelt**	**Roosevelt**	**Roosevelt**
1948	Thurmond	**Truman**	Thurmond	**Truman**
1952	Stevenson	Stevenson	Stevenson	**Eisenhower**
1956	Stevenson	**Eisenhower**	Stevenson	**Eisenhower**
1960	Byrd	Nixon	Byrd	Nixon
1964	Goldwater	**Johnson**	Goldwater	**Johnson**
1968	Wallace	**Nixon**	Wallace	**Nixon**
1972	**Nixon**	**Nixon**	**Nixon**	**Nixon**
1976	**Carter**	**Carter**	**Carter**	**Carter**
1980	**Reagan**	**Reagan**	**Reagan**	**Reagan**
1984	**Reagan**	**Reagan**	**Reagan**	**Reagan**
1988	**Bush**	**Bush**	**Bush**	**Bush**
1992	Bush	**Clinton**	Bush	**Clinton**
1996	Dole	**Clinton**	Dole	**Clinton**
2000	**Bush**	**Bush**	**Bush**	**Bush**
2004	**Bush**	**Bush**	**Bush**	**Bush**
2008	McCain	McCain	McCain	McCain
2012	Romney	Romney	Romney	Romney
2016	**Trump**	**Trump**	**Trump**	**Trump**
2020	Trump	Trump	Trump	Trump
2024	**Trump**	**Trump**	**Trump**	**Trump**
Year	Alabama	Kentucky	Mississippi	Tennessee
