= Estates of Deceased Persons (Forfeiture Rule and Law of Succession) Act 2011 =

UK act of Parliament

- Act of Parliament
- Parliament of the United Kingdom
- Long title: An Act to amend the law relating to the distribution of the estates of deceased persons; and for connected purposes.
- Citation: 2011 c. 7
- Introduced by: Greg Knight (Commons); Lord Hunt of Wirral (Lords)
- Territorial extent: England and Wales

Dates
- Royal assent: 12 July 2011
- Commencement: 1 February 2012
Other legislation
Relates to	Forfeiture Act 1982

Status: Current legislation

Text of the Estates of Deceased Persons (Forfeiture Rule and Law of Succession) Act 2011 as in force today (including any amendments) within the United Kingdom, from legislation.gov.uk.

The Estates of Deceased Persons (Forfeiture Rule and Law of Succession) Act 2011 (c. 7) is an act of the Parliament of the United Kingdom altering the rules on inheritance in England and Wales.

Under the forfeiture rule of English common law, a person may not inherit from someone whom he or she has unlawfully killed. In 2000, the Court of Appeal used that rule to disinherit not only a murderer but also the murderer’s descendants. The Law Commission published a consultation paper covering the issue in October 2003 followed by a final report on 27 July 2005. Their recommendations became the basis for this Act.

Under the Act, if a person loses their right to inheritance through the forfeiture rule, or through disclaiming it, that person is to be treated (for purposes of determining inheritance) as having died immediately prior to the testator or the intestate. The Act amends the Administration of Estates Act 1925 and Wills Act 1837 accordingly.

The Act received its Royal Assent on 12 July 2011, and came into force on 1 February 2012.

The act implemented a 2005 Law Commission recommendation.

The legislation received cross-party and government support.

== See also ==
- Forfeiture Act 1982
- Slayer rule
- Golden rule (law): describing a similar case from 1935.
