= List of independent south atlantic football champions =

This is a list of yearly claims to an Independent South Atlantic football championship.

- 1907 - NC A&M
- 1910 - Georgetown or NC A&M
- 1911 - Georgetown
- 1924 - Washington & Lee
