= Danielz v De Wet =

South African legal case

In Danielz v De Wet, an important case in the South African law of succession, Danielz was the executor of De Wet's estate. Danielz sought an order declaring the deceased's widow (the sole nominated beneficiary) unworthy of inheriting. The reason for this was that the widow had hired an accomplice to assault the deceased and as a result of the assault, the deceased died.

The widow claimed that she had only hired an accomplice to assault the deceased and not to kill him, but both were found guilty of murder.

The court considered the question of whether the bloedige hand principle could be extended to cover insurance benefits owing to a nominated beneficiary.

The court held that public policy dictates that the principle should not be limited and accordingly extended its application to the statute.

== See also ==
- Law of succession in South Africa
