= Riggs v. Palmer =

1889 New York state civil court case

Riggs v Palmer
- Court: Court of Appeals of New York
- Full case name: Philo Riggs, as Guardian ad litem et al., Appellants, v. Elmer E. Palmer et al., Respondents.
- Decided: October 8, 1889
- Citation: 115 NY 506 (1889)

Case opinions
- Decision by: Robert Earl
- Dissent: John Clinton Gray, joined by George F. Danforth

Keywords
- Wills; killing; construction

Riggs v. Palmer, 115 N.Y. 506 (1889), is an important New York state civil court case, in which the Court of Appeals of New York issued an 1889 opinion. Riggs was an example of the judiciary using the "social purpose" rule of statutory construction, the process of interpreting and applying legislation.

== Facts ==
In Riggs, a probate suit, the plaintiffs, Mrs. Riggs and Mrs. Preston, sought to invalidate the will of their father Francis B. Palmer; testated on August 13, 1880. The defendant in the case was Elmer E. Palmer, grandson to the testator. The will gave small legacies to the plaintiffs, Mrs. Preston and Mrs. Riggs, and the bulk of the estate to Elmer Palmer to be cared for by his mother, Susan Palmer, the widow of a dead son of the testator, until he became of legal age.

In 1882, knowing that he was to be the recipient of his grandfather's large estate, the 16-year-old Elmer, fearing that his grandfather might change the will, murdered his grandfather by poisoning him.

The plaintiffs argued that by allowing the will to be executed Elmer would be profiting from his crime. While a criminal law existed to punish Elmer for the murder, there was no statute under either probate or criminal law that invalidated his claim to the estate based on his role in the murder.

== Judgment ==
Judge Robert Earl (in office 1870 and 1875–1894) wrote the majority opinion for the court, which ruled in favor of the plaintiffs in a vote of five to two. The court reasoned that tenets of universal law and maxims would be violated by allowing Elmer to profit from his crime. The court held that the legislature could not be reasonably expected to address all contingencies in crafting laws and that, had they reason to suspect one might behave in the manner Elmer did, they certainly would have addressed that situation.

Judge Earl, in an analogy to a similar case, wrote: "The principle which lies at the bottom of the maxim, volenti non fit injuria ['to a willing person, no injury be done'], should be applied to such a case, and a widow should not, for the purpose of acquiring, as such, property rights, be permitted to allege a widowhood which she has wickedly and intentionally created." Thus, the majority applied what eventually became known as the slayer rule, which bars murderers from benefitting from their victim's will or otherwise inheriting property from their victim.

Dissent

Judge John Clinton Gray (in office 1888–1913) dissented. He argued that the criminal law established punishment for the murder of Francis Palmer. For the court to deny the estate to Elmer was to, in effect, add significant further punishment to what Elmer received under the criminal statute, something the court was not permitted to do without the express authorization of statute. The written statutes that existed did not sanction the action of the court and the court cannot simply create or imagine such statutes so as to obtain a morally pleasing result. Gray's view of literal interpretation of the statute was in contrast with the majority opinion which gave legislators' presumed intentions influence over the actual statutes in place.

== Significance ==
Legal philosopher Ronald Dworkin uses Riggs in an argument against legal positivism, focusing on a version of legal positivism by H. L. A. Hart. Positivism holds that all legal decisions by courts are classified into one of two categories. Some are central to the legal rules at issue. In these cases, judges merely apply the rules which fall within their jurisdiction. The other category of decisions occupy the penumbra of legal rules, where the direction of the legal rule is unclear. In these cases, judges must decide which of the possible applications of the legal rules are best social policy and then apply the rule which is best.

Dworkin argues that Riggs has two features which contradict Hart's interpretation of the legal process. First, this case does not appear to lie at the edge of legal rules, instead being very clearly central. Despite this, the majority did not apply the legal rule as required. Second, there appears to be a legitimate debate about what the law is, and not what the law should be, in this case. According to Dworkin, under most versions of legal positivism, Hart's included, there should rarely be debate about what counts as law.

== See also ==
- Slayer rule
- English trusts law
