= George Zabriskie Gray =

American Episcopal clergyman and educator

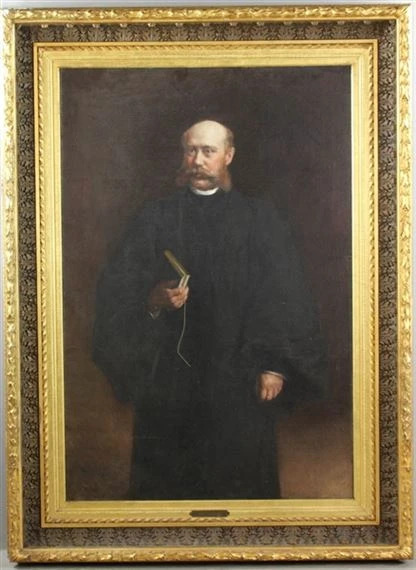
- Portrait of George Zabriskie Gray by Frederick Porter Vinton, 1891
- Born: June 14, 1837; New York City, New York, U.S.
- Died: August 4, 1889 (aged 52); Sharon Springs, New York, U.S.
- Education: University of the City of New-York; Virginia Theological Seminary
- Occupations: Theologian, educator, author
- Spouse: Kate Forrest (m. 1862)
- Relatives: John Clinton Gray (brother)

George Zabriskie Gray (July 14, 1837 – August 4, 1889) was a notable clergyman, educator and theologian of the Episcopal Church in the United States.

== Early life ==
Gray was born in New York City on July 14, 1837. He was a son of Susan Maria (née Zabriskie) Gray (1814–1904) and John Alexander Clinton Gray (1815–1898), a dry goods merchant in New York City. His older brother was Albert Zabriskie Gray, warden of Racine College, and his younger brother was jurist John Clinton Gray and his sisters were Katharine Gray (wife of Hackley Bartholomew Bacon) and Frances Susan Gray. He was of French-Huguenot and Polish descent.

In 1858, when he was twenty years old, he graduated from the University of the City of New-York (which gave him an honorary D.D. in 1876), followed by preparations for the ministry at Alexandria Theological Seminary in Virginia from 1859 until 1861, but due to the U.S. Civil War, the school was relocated to Philadelphia, where he completed his degree.

== Career ==
On April 22, 1862, Gray was ordained deacon by Bishop Horatio Potter, the sixth bishop of the Episcopal Diocese of New York, followed by ordination as priest a year later on January 22, 1863, also by Bishop Potter.

Gray served as rector of St. Paul's Church in Kinderhook, New York and Trinity Church in Bergen Point, New Jersey. In 1876, he was appointed dean of Episcopal Theological School in Cambridge, Massachusetts (now Episcopal Divinity School) from 1876-1889.

Gray was the author of several books, including Recognition in the World to Come (1875), Husband and Wife; or, the Theory of Marriage (1885), and The Children's Crusade: An Episode of the Thirteenth Century (1870).

== Personal life ==
On June 19, 1862, he was married Kate Forrest (1841–1905), with whom he had two sons and a daughter, including:

- Sarah Forrest Gray (1863–1933), who married George Zabriskie (1852–1931)
- George Zabriskie Gray Jr. (1873–1895), a Yale University student and member of Scroll and Key who was secretary and treasurer of the Yale Yacht Club and who died from appendicitis in London at age 21.

After suffering from Bright's disease for several months, Gray died at the Pavilion Hotel in Sharon Springs, New York where he had been spending the summer on August 4, 1889. His funeral was held at Saint Thomas Church in Manhattan.
