= Social purpose =

Rule of statutory construction

Within the context of United States law, "social purpose" is a scheme of statutory construction declaring that a statute should not be construed in a way that would violate normal societal values or good. Example of cases in which this rule of construction was used include Riggs v. Palmer (1889) and Holy Trinity Church v. United States (1892).
