= List of United States Supreme Court cases, volume 233 =

Supreme Court of the United States
- Interactive map of Supreme Court of the United States
- 38°53′26″N 77°00′16″W
- Established: March 4, 1789; 236 years ago
- Location: Washington, D.C.
- Coordinates: 38°53′26″N 77°00′16″W
- Composition method: Presidential nomination with Senate confirmation
- Authorised by: Constitution of the United States, Art. III, § 1
- Judge term length: life tenure, subject to impeachment and removal
- Number of positions: 9 (by statute)
- Website: supremecourt.gov

This is a list of cases reported in volume 233 of United States Reports, decided by the Supreme Court of the United States in 1914.

== Justices of the Supreme Court at the time of volume 233 U.S. ==
The Supreme Court is established by Article III, Section 1 of the Constitution of the United States, which says: "The judicial Power of the United States, shall be vested in one supreme Court . . .". The size of the Court is not specified; the Constitution leaves it to Congress to set the number of justices. Under the Judiciary Act of 1789 Congress originally fixed the number of justices at six (one chief justice and five associate justices). Since 1789 Congress has varied the size of the Court from six to seven, nine, ten, and back to nine justices (always including one chief justice).

When the cases in volume 233 were decided the Court comprised the following nine members:

Portrait	Justice	Office	Home State	Succeeded	Date confirmed by the Senate (Vote)	Tenure on Supreme Court
	Edward Douglass White	Chief Justice	Louisiana	Melville Fuller	December 12, 1910 (Acclamation)	December 19, 1910 – May 19, 1921 (Died)
	Joseph McKenna	Associate Justice	California	Stephen Johnson Field	January 21, 1898 (Acclamation)	January 26, 1898 – January 5, 1925 (Retired)
	Oliver Wendell Holmes Jr.	Associate Justice	Massachusetts	Horace Gray	December 4, 1902 (Acclamation)	December 8, 1902 – January 12, 1932 (Retired)
	William R. Day	Associate Justice	Ohio	George Shiras Jr.	February 23, 1903 (Acclamation)	March 2, 1903 – November 13, 1922 (Retired)
	Horace Harmon Lurton	Associate Justice	Tennessee	Rufus W. Peckham	December 20, 1909 (Acclamation)	January 3, 1910 – July 12, 1914 (Died)
	Charles Evans Hughes	Associate Justice	New York	David Josiah Brewer	May 2, 1910 (Acclamation)	October 10, 1910 – June 10, 1916 (Resigned)
	Willis Van Devanter	Associate Justice	Wyoming	Edward Douglass White (as Associate Justice)	December 15, 1910 (Acclamation)	January 3, 1911 – June 2, 1937 (Retired)
	Joseph Rucker Lamar	Associate Justice	Georgia	William Henry Moody	December 15, 1910 (Acclamation)	January 3, 1911 – January 2, 1916 (Died)
	Mahlon Pitney	Associate Justice	New Jersey	John Marshall Harlan	March 13, 1912 (50–26)	March 18, 1912 – December 31, 1922 (Resigned)

== Citation style ==
Under the Judiciary Act of 1789 the federal court structure at the time comprised District Courts, which had general trial jurisdiction; Circuit Courts, which had mixed trial and appellate (from the US District Courts) jurisdiction; and the United States Supreme Court, which had appellate jurisdiction over the federal District and Circuit courts—and for certain issues over state courts. The Supreme Court also had limited original jurisdiction (i.e., in which cases could be filed directly with the Supreme Court without first having been heard by a lower federal or state court). There were one or more federal District Courts and/or Circuit Courts in each state, territory, or other geographical region.

The Judiciary Act of 1891 created the United States Courts of Appeals and reassigned the jurisdiction of most routine appeals from the district and circuit courts to these appellate courts. The Act created nine new courts that were originally known as the "United States Circuit Courts of Appeals." The new courts had jurisdiction over most appeals of lower court decisions. The Supreme Court could review either legal issues that a court of appeals certified or decisions of court of appeals by writ of certiorari.

On January 1, 1912, the effective date of the Judicial Code of 1911, the old Circuit Courts were abolished, with their remaining trial court jurisdiction transferred to the U.S. District Courts.

Bluebook citation style is used for case names, citations, and jurisdictions.

- "# Cir." = United States Court of Appeals
  - e.g., "3d Cir." = United States Court of Appeals for the Third Circuit
- "C.C.D." = United States Circuit Court for the District of . . .
  - e.g.,"C.C.D.N.J." = United States Circuit Court for the District of New Jersey
- "D." = United States District Court for the District of . . .
  - e.g.,"D. Mass." = United States District Court for the District of Massachusetts
- "E." = Eastern; "M." = Middle; "N." = Northern; "S." = Southern; "W." = Western
  - e.g.,"C.C.S.D.N.Y." = United States Circuit Court for the Southern District of New York
  - e.g.,"M.D. Ala." = United States District Court for the Middle District of Alabama
- "Ct. Cl." = United States Court of Claims
- The abbreviation of a state's name alone indicates the highest appellate court in that state's judiciary at the time.
  - e.g.,"Pa." = Supreme Court of Pennsylvania
  - e.g.,"Me." = Supreme Judicial Court of Maine

== List of cases in volume 233 U.S. ==
Case Name	Page and year	Opinion of the Court	Concurring opinion(s)	Dissenting opinion(s)	Lower Court	Disposition
Miller v. United States	1 (1914)	White	none	none	Ct. Cl.	affirmed
Browning v. Waycross	16 (1914)	White	none	none	Ga. Ct. App.	affirmed
De Bearn v. Safe Deposit and Trust Company of Baltimore	24 (1914)	White	none	none	D. Md.	dismissed
Metzger Motor Car Company v. Parrott	36 (1914)	White	none	none	E.D. Mich.	reversed
Grand Trunk Western Railroad Company v. Lindsay	42 (1914)	White	none	none	7th Cir.	affirmed
Carlesi v. New York	51 (1914)	White	none	none	N.Y. Ct. Gen. Sess.	affirmed
Archer v. Greenville Sand and Gravel Company	60 (1914)	McKenna	none	none	5th Cir.	reversed
Herbert v. Bicknell	70 (1914)	Holmes	none	none	Sup. Ct. Terr. Haw.	affirmed
Kansas City Southern Railway Company v. Kaw Valley Drainage District	75 (1914)	Holmes	none	none	Kan.	reversed
Southern Railway v. Bennett	80 (1914)	Holmes	none	none	S.C.	affirmed
Arizona ex rel. Gaines v. Copper Queen Consolidated Mining Company	87 (1914)	Day	none	none	Ariz.	affirmed
Boston and Maine Railroad Company v. Hooker	97 (1914)	Day	none	Pitney	Mass. Super. Ct.	reversed
United States ex rel. Texas Portland Cement Company v. McCord	157 (1914)	Day	none	none	3d Cir.	certification
Hollerbach v. United States	165 (1914)	Day	none	none	Ct. Cl.	reversed
Atchison, Topeka and Santa Fe Railway Company v. Robinson	173 (1914)	Day	none	none	Okla.	reversed
Atchison, Topeka and Santa Fe Railway Company v. Moore	182 (1914)	Day	none	none	Okla.	reversed
Myers v. Pittsburgh Coal Company	184 (1914)	Day	none	none	3d Cir.	reversed
Russell v. Sebastian	195 (1914)	Hughes	none	none	Cal.	reversed
Union Lime Company v. Chicago and Northwestern Railroad Company	211 (1914)	Hughes	none	none	Wis.	affirmed
United States v. Birdsall	223 (1914)	Hughes	none	none	N.D. Iowa	reversed
Diamond Coal and Coke Company v. United States	236 (1914)	VanDevanter	none	none	8th Cir.	affirmed
El Paso Brick Company v. McKnight	250 (1914)	Lamar	none	none	N.M.	reversed
American Iron and Steel Manufacturing Company v. Seaboard Air Line Railroad Company	261 (1914)	Lamar	none	none	4th Cir.	certification
Franklin v. Lynch	269 (1914)	Lamar	none	none	Okla.	affirmed
Tevis v. Ryan	273 (1914)	Pitney	none	none	Ariz.	affirmed
Lewis v. Frick	291 (1914)	Pitney	none	none	6th Cir.	affirmed
Singer Sewing Machine Company v. Brickell	304 (1914)	Pitney	none	none	S.D. Ala.	affirmed
O'Sullivan v. Felix	318 (1914)	McKenna	none	none	5th Cir.	affirmed
Kansas City Southern Railway Company v. Anderson	325 (1914)	McKenna	none	none	Ark.	affirmed
Hammond Packing Company v. Montana	331 (1914)	Holmes	none	none	Mont.	affirmed
Chicago, Milwaukee and St. Paul Railway Company v. Iowa	334 (1914)	Hughes	none	none	Iowa	affirmed
White v. Island Transportation Company	346 (1914)	VanDevanter	none	none	W.D. Wash.	affirmed
Farrugia v. Philadelphia and Reading Railroad Company	352 (1914)	VanDevanter	none	none	E.D. Pa.	dismissed
Tennessee Coal, Iron and Railroad Company v. George	354 (1914)	Lamar	none	none	Ga. Ct. App.	affirmed
Carondelet Canal and Navigation Company v. Louisiana	362 (1914)	McKenna	none	none	La.	reversed
German Alliance Insurance Company v. Lewis	389 (1914)	McKenna	none	Lamar	C.C.D. Kan.	affirmed
Wheeler v. Sohmer	434 (1914)	Holmes	McKenna	Lamar	N.Y. County Sur. Ct.	affirmed
Nadal v. May	447 (1914)	Holmes	none	none	D.P.R.	affirmed
San Joaquin and Kings River Canal and Irrigation Company v. Stanislaus County	454 (1914)	Holmes	none	none	C.C.N.D. Cal.	reversed
Thaddeus Davids Company v. Davids Manufacturing Company	461 (1914)	Hughes	none	none	2d Cir.	reversed
Marks otherwise prohibited by the Act of 1905 (for example, surnames) can be registered if used exclusively for ten years preceding the act, per section 5 of that Act.
Illinois Central Railroad Company v. Behrens	473 (1914)	VanDevanter	none	none	5th Cir.	certification
Baer Brothers Mercantile Company v. Denver and Rio Grande Western Railroad Company	479 (1914)	Lamar	none	none	8th Cir.	reversed
Seaboard Air Line Railroad Company v. Horton	492 (1914)	Pitney	none	none	N.C.	reversed
United States v. Vulte	509 (1914)	McKenna	none	none	Ct. Cl.	affirmed
United States v. Foster	515 (1914)	McKenna	none	none	D. Mass.	reversed
Bowling and Miami Investment Company v. United States	528 (1914)	Hughes	none	none	8th Cir.	affirmed
Holden Land and Live Stock Company v. Interstate Trading Company	536 (1914)	Hughes	none	Day	Kan.	dismissed
Richards v. Washington Terminal Company	546 (1914)	Pitney	none	none	D.C. Cir.	reversed
Green v. Menominee Tribe	558 (1914)	White	none	none	Ct. Cl.	affirmed
Southern Railroad Company v. Gadd	572 (1914)	White	none	none	6th Cir.	affirmed
Itow v. United States	581 (1914)	White	none	none	D. Alaska	dismissed
Apapas v. United States	587 (1914)	White	none	none	S.D. Cal.	dismissed
Cornell Steamboat Company v. Phoenix Construction Company	593 (1914)	White	none	none	N.Y. Sup. Ct.	affirmed
Denver and Rio Grande Railroad Company v. Arizona and Colorado Railroad Company	601 (1914)	Holmes	none	none	N.M.	affirmed
Gompers v. United States	604 (1914)	Holmes	none	none	D.C. Cir.	reversed
Logan v. Davis	613 (1914)	VanDevanter	none	none	Iowa	reversed
Smith v. Texas	630 (1914)	Lamar	none	none	Tex. Crim. App.	reversed
Missouri, Kansas & Texas Railway Company of Texas v. Cade	642 (1914)	Pitney	none	none	Dallas County Justice Ct.	affirmed
Bowe v. Scott	658 (1914)	White	none	none	Va.	dismissed
McDonald v. Oregon Railroad and Navigation Company Company	665 (1914)	White	none	none	Or.	dismissed
Erie Railroad Company v. New York	671 (1914)	McKenna	none	none	N.Y. Sup. Ct.	reversed
Erie Railroad Company v. Williams	685 (1914)	McKenna	none	none	N.Y. Sup. Ct.	affirmed
Valdes v. Larrinaga	705 (1914)	Holmes	none	none	D.P.R.	affirmed
Detroit Steel Cooperage Company v. Sistersville Brewing Company	712 (1914)	Holmes	none	none	4th Cir.	reversed
Oceanic Steam Navigation Company v. Mellor	718 (1914)	Holmes	none	none	2d Cir.	certification
