= Roberson v. Rochester Folding Box Co =

Roberson v. Rochester Folding Box Co.
- Court: New York Court of Appeals
- Full case name: Abigail M. Roberson, an Infant, by Margaret E. Bell, her Guardian ad Litem, Respondent, v. The Rochester Folding Box Company et al., Appellants
- Argued: February 13, 1902
- Decided: June 27, 1902

Roberson v. Rochester Folding Box Co. (1902) was a pivotal case for establishing the first privacy laws in the United States. The highest court in New York, the New York Court of Appeals, rejected Roberson's claim. Due to this, there was public outrage which led to the swift implementation of one of the first privacy rights in 1903. The New York State Legislature created section 50 and section 51 which continues to exist to this day.

== Background ==
Abigail Roberson (Plaintiff) brought suit against, Franklin Mills and the Rochester Folding-Box Company (Defendant), who apparently used her portrait in advertisement posters without her consent, for the sum of $15,000.

Abigail Roberson was a Rochester teenager who had her portrait taken at a local photographic studio near her home in Corn Hill, Rochester, New York. Without her prior knowledge or consent, one of her pictures ended up on 25,000 lithographic posters advertising the flour made by Franklin Mills. The poster had a headline "Flour of the Family" and was created by Rochester Folding-Box Company. It was placed in stores, warehouses, saloons, where Roberson's acquaintances could identify her. Roberson was greatly humiliated by the scoffs and jeers of the people who recognized her face. The resulting humiliation caused her to suffer a severe nervous shock, which confined her to bed and required treatment by a physician.

In 1890, Samuel Warren and Louis Brandeis published an article on The Right to Privacy. On the basis of this article, Roberson decided to sue both companies involved in the ad’s creation.

The lawsuit was filed in Monroe County Supreme Court in 1900, when Roberson was 17. It claimed that the ad had been printed and distributed throughout the country without Roberson's permission. Because the companies had inflicted a mental anguish upon Roberson purely for the “purpose of profit and gain to themselves,” her lawsuit sought $15,000 in compensation, the equivalent of about $450,000 today and that the defendants be prohibited from making, printing, publishing, circulating or using any likeliness of her in any form.

== Court arguments ==
=== Supreme Court Monroe County ===
On 1 August 1900, the trial was held in Supreme Court Monroe County. The defendants (Franklin Mills and the Rochester Folding Box Co.) contended to have the case dismissed over the fact that they had the right to use Roberson's picture and there existed no laws that could restrain them from using the picture.

The trial judge stated that if any person may desire to circulate and use the image of the plaintiff as an advertising scheme and if the courts had no power to protect her, then that would be a blot on the system of jurisprudence. The judge explained that the case would be different if the person was already famous and the unauthorized use of their image would add to their publicity. The judge added that any modest person whose lithographic likeness was used without their permission in public places would be extremely shocked, wounded and their right of privacy would be violated.

The judge concluded that if Roberson's image, because it was beautiful had value as an advertising medium, then the right to this value belonged to her.

The Supreme Court judge ruled in Roberson's favor and stated that she is entitled to the relief demanded in her complaint.

=== Appellate Division of Supreme Court of New York ===
On 1 July 1901, the defendants (Franklin Mills and the Rochester Folding Box Co.) appealed in the intermediate appellate court of New York. The appellate court affirmed with the trial court's decision and ordered that the defendant answer the payment of the cost to Roberson.

=== Court of Appeals of the State of New York ===
On 27 June 1902, the defendants (Franklin Mills and the Rochester Folding Box Co.) appealed in the highest court in New York, the Court of Appeals of the State of New York. The court of appeals divergently agreed (4-3) and overturned Roberson's victory.

Chief Judge Alton Parker and his colleagues in the majority reasoned that the "right of privacy" had not yet found a place in the jurisprudence. Roberson's face had no inherent value and there was no physical property that had been stolen from her. They invalidated her case on the basis that her reputation was not damaged and her distress was purely mental. If they would have not overturned the decision then it would open the floodgates of litigation bordering on the absurd.

Alton Parker stated that Roberson should have been flattered that her picture was selected and asserted it was a compliment to her beauty.

==== Dissent ====
Judge John Clinton Gray argued that instantaneous photography, as a product of modern social evolution, inevitably enabled individuals to be photographed without their consent. While he viewed this initial intrusion as largely unavoidable, he maintained that the commercial publication or use of such images constituted a distinct and serious invasion of personal privacy. Judge Gray analogized the unauthorized commercial use of a person’s likeness to other privacy and property-like interests protected in courts of equity, reasoning that equitable relief was appropriate where the law had long restrained nonphysical invasions of personal rights that caused serious and irreparable harm.

== Reaction and aftermath ==
After the Court of Appeals overturned Roberson's victory, the public criticism forced one of the judges, Judge Denis O'Brien to defend his decision. In the article for Columbia Law Review Judge O'Brien justified that no law regarding right to privacy existed and pointed that judges should not make new laws but simply interpret and enforce existing law. He asserted that it is the duty of the State Legislature to create new laws.

The New York State Legislature swiftly enacted the 1903 Act to “Prevent the Unauthorized Use of the Name or Picture of Any Person for the Purposes of Trade," Section 50 and Section 51 of the state’s Civil Rights Law following a public uproar after the appeal New York Court of Appeal decision and based on O'Brien's article.
