= Forfeiture Act 1982 =

Act of the Parliament of the United Kingdom

Forfeiture Act 1982 (Note: Section 7(1).)
- Act of Parliament
- Parliament of the United Kingdom
- Long title: An Act to provide for relief for persons guilty of unlawful killing from forfeiture of inheritance and other rights; to enable such persons to apply for financial provision out of the deceased’s estate; to provide for the question whether pension and social security benefits have been forfeited to be determined by the Social Security Commissioners; and for connected purposes.
- Citation: 1982 c. 34
- Territorial extent: England and Wales; Scotland; Northern Ireland (section 6); (Note: Section 7(3). Section 6 makes provision for passing similar legislation in Northern Ireland.)

Dates
- Royal assent: 13 July 1982
- Commencement: 13 July 1982 (sections 6 and 7); 13 October 1982 (sections 1 to 3 and 5); 31 December 1982 (section 4); (Note: Section 7(2).)
Other legislation
Amended by	Social Security Act 1986; Statutory Sick Pay Act 1991; Social Security (Consequential Provisions) Act 1992; Armed Forces (Pensions and Compensation) Act 2004; Civil Partnership Act 2004; Transfer of Tribunal Functions Order 2008; Pensions Act 2014; Succession (Scotland) Act 2016
Relates to	Estates of Deceased Persons (Forfeiture Rule and Law of Succession) Act 2011

Status: Amended

Text of statute as originally enacted

Revised text of statute as amended

Text of the Forfeiture Act 1982 as in force today (including any amendments) within the United Kingdom, from legislation.gov.uk.

The Forfeiture Act 1982 (c. 34) is an act of the Parliament of the United Kingdom which allows the court to relax or to set aside operation of the rigid common law rule where "the justice of the case" so requires (other than to benefit a murderer).Under the English common law rule known as the 'forfeiture rule', a person who has unlawfully killed another is barred from acquiring any benefit as a consequence of the killing, and all inheritance and other rights are normally forfeit.

== Provisions ==
Under section 1(1) the 'forfeiture rule' is defined as "the rule of public policy which in certain circumstances precludes a person who has unlawfully killed another from acquiring a benefit in consequence of the killing". Section 2 provides:

- (1) The court shall not make an order under this section modifying the effect of the forfeiture rule in any case unless it is satisfied that, having regard to the conduct of the offender and of the deceased and to such other circumstances as appear to the court to be material, the justice of the case requires the effect of the rule to be so modified in that case.
- (2) Where a court determines that the forfeiture rule has precluded a person (in this section referred to as "the offender") who has unlawfully killed another from acquiring any interest in property ... the court may make an order under this section modifying the effect of that rule.

Section 5 prevents the court from relaxing or setting aside the normal forfeiture rule to benefit a person who has been convicted of murder.

== See also ==
- Estates of Deceased Persons (Forfeiture Rule and Law of Succession) Act 2011
- Slayer rule - similar rule in United States law
