= South Atlantic states =

U.S. census division

Coordinates: 35°N 80°W

South Atlantic The Southeast, The South East Coast, The American Southeast
- Region
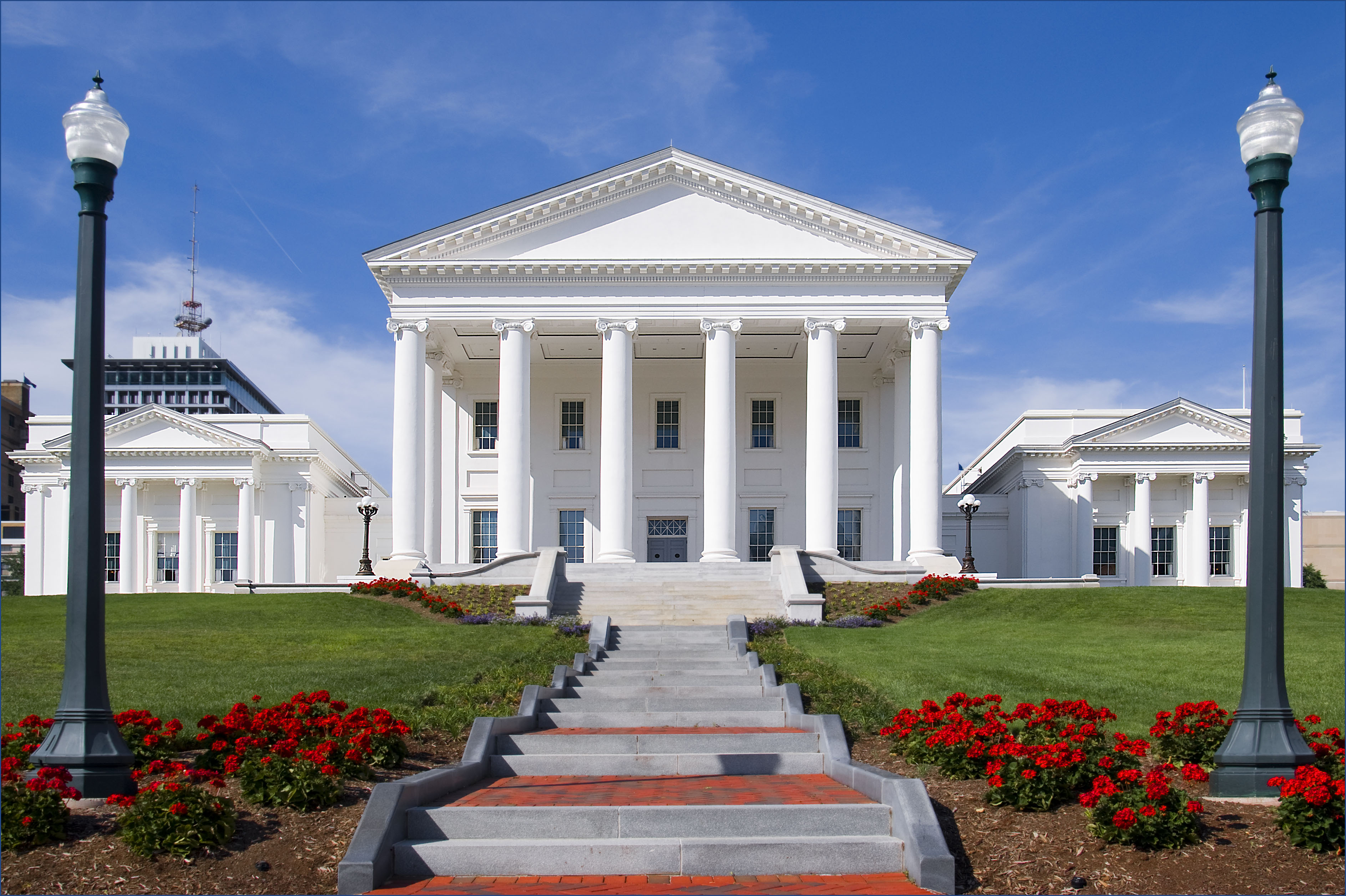
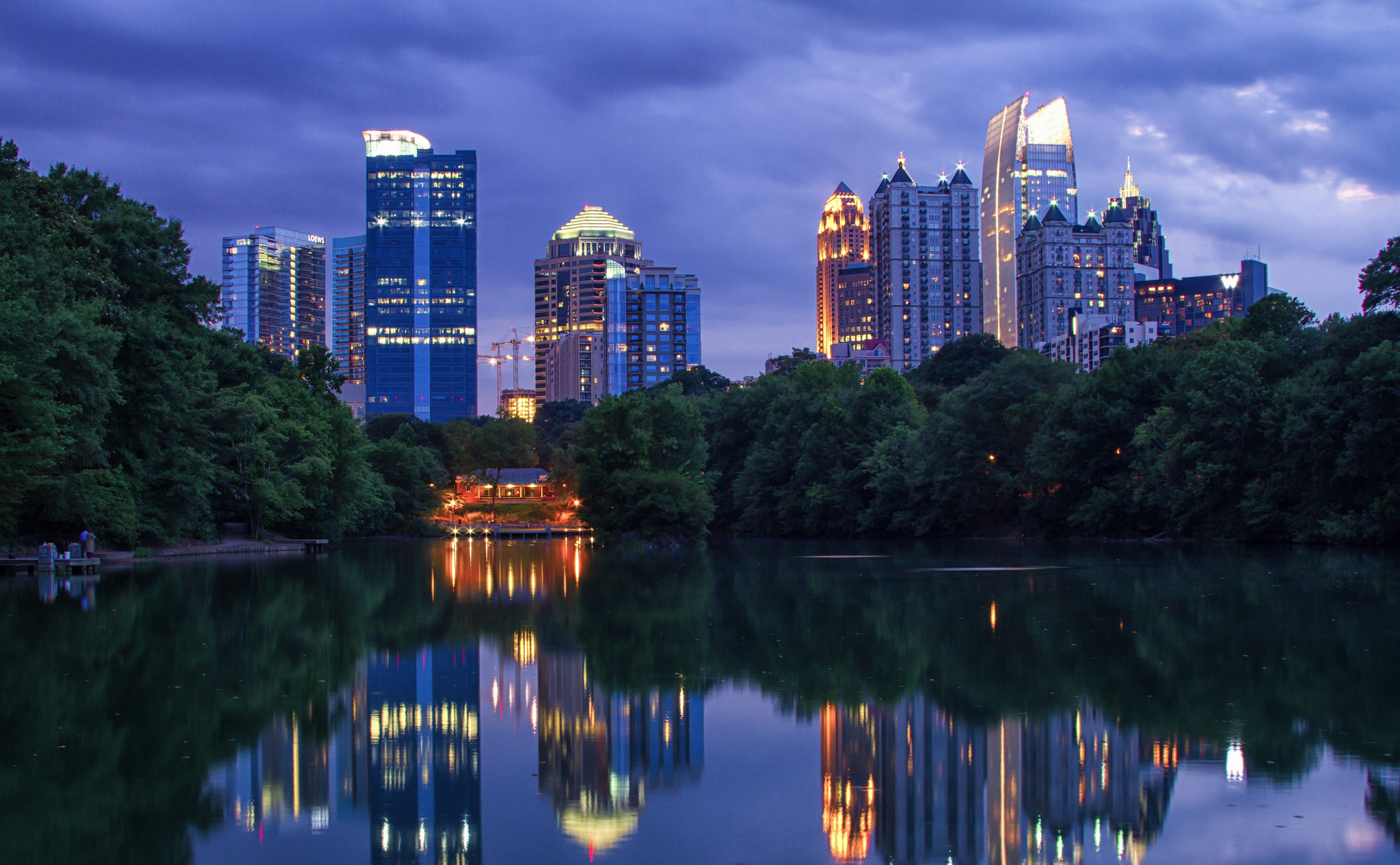
- Jacksonville Blue Ridge Parkway Virginia State Capitol Atlanta Rainbow Row New River Gorge Bridge United States Capitol

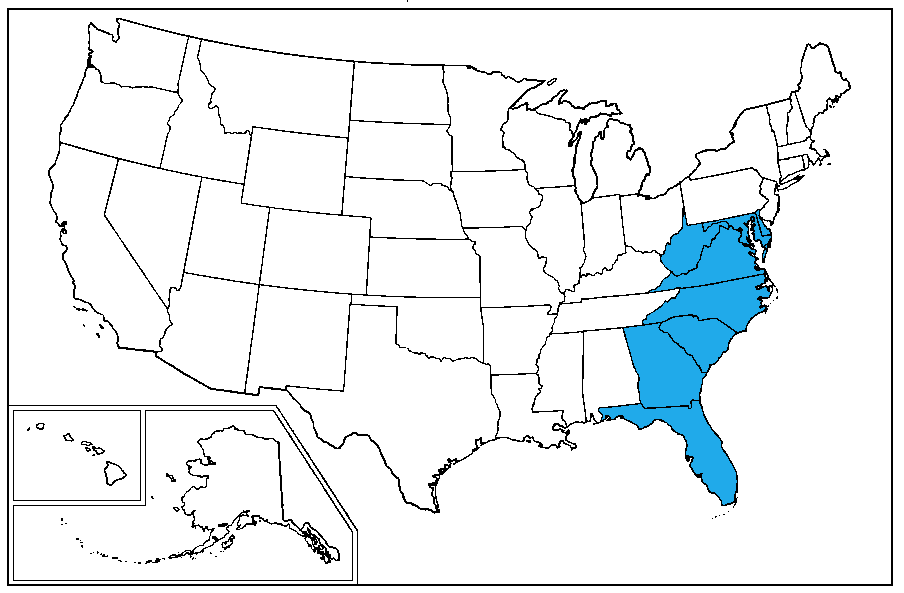
- Florida, Georgia, North Carolina, Virginia, Maryland, South Carolina, West Virginia, Delaware, and Washington, D.C.
- Largest city: Jacksonville
- Largest metro: Atlanta metropolitan area

Area
  - Total: 757,800 km^{2} (292,589 sq mi)

Population
  - Total: 61,774,970

The South Atlantic states form one of the nine Census Bureau Divisions within the United States that are recognized by the United States Census Bureau. This region, U.S. Census Bureau Region 3, Division 5, corresponds to the South (states/areas that were geographically part of the Thirteen Colonies) with the addition of Florida.

== Terminology ==
The name of the census division does not refer to the South Atlantic Ocean, but rather to its location along the Atlantic Coast of the United States. Farther north are the Census-defined Middle Atlantic and New England (or North Atlantic) states.

== Geography ==
This division includes eight states and one district; Delaware, Florida, Georgia, Maryland, North Carolina, South Carolina, Virginia, West Virginia and Washington. This division is also a recognized geographical division used by the United States Geological Survey. All entities within the region apart from the District of Columbia and West Virginia border the North Atlantic Ocean.

Together with the East South Central states (Alabama, Kentucky, Mississippi and Tennessee) and the West South Central states (Arkansas, Louisiana, Oklahoma and Texas), the South Atlantic states constitute the United States Census Bureau's broader Census Bureau Region of the South (the other three regions being the Northeast, Midwest and West, all of which have two divisions).

== Demographics ==
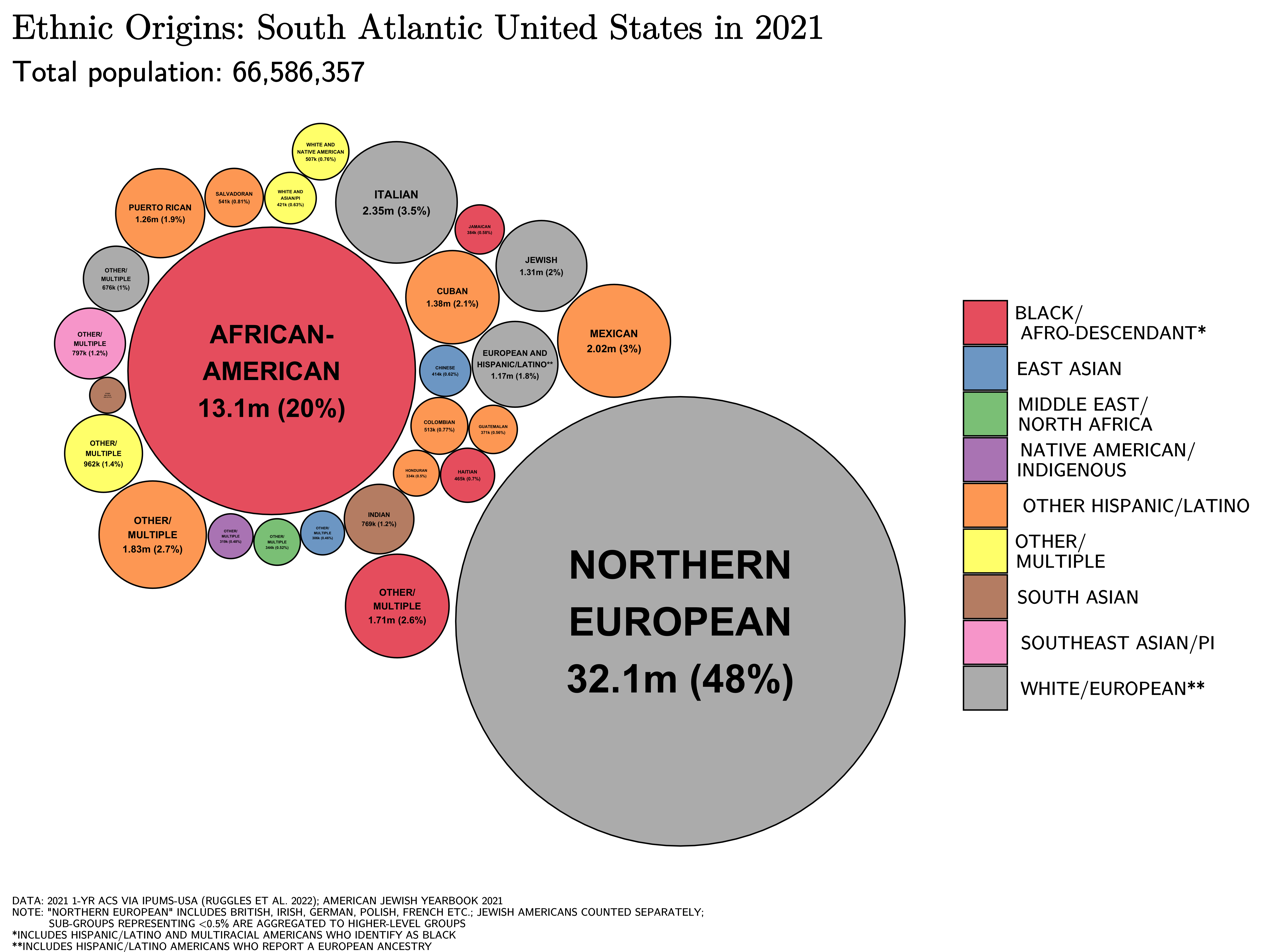
Ethnic origins in South Atlantic states

As of 2010, the South Atlantic states had a combined population of 61,774,970. The South Atlantic states region covers 292,589 square miles (757,800 km^{2}). With the exception of West Virginia, the region has seen rapid population growth and economic development in recent decades.

States and Federal District in the South Atlantic
State	2020 census	Land area
Delaware	989,948	1,982
Florida	21,538,187	65,755
Georgia	10,711,908	59,425
Maryland	6,177,224	12,407
North Carolina	10,439,388	53,819
South Carolina	5,118,435	32,020
Virginia	8,631,393	42,774
West Virginia	1,793,716	24,230
Washington, D.C.	689,545	177

Ten largest cities by population in the South Atlantic states region
	City	2020 census
1	Jacksonville, Florida	949,611
2	Charlotte, North Carolina	874,579
3	Washington, D.C.	689,545
4	Baltimore, Maryland	585,708
5	Atlanta, Georgia	498,715
6	Raleigh, North Carolina	467,665
7	Virginia Beach, Virginia	459,470
8	Miami, Florida	442,241
9	Tampa, Florida	384,959
10	Orlando, Florida	307,573

Largest metropolitan statistical areas in the region
	Metro area	2020 census
1	Washington-Arlington-Alexandria, DC-VA-MD-WV MSA	6,385,162
2	Atlanta-Sandy Springs-Alpharetta, GA MSA	6,220,106
3	Miami-Fort Lauderdale-West Palm Beach, FL MSA	6,138,333
4	Tampa-St. Petersburg-Clearwater, FL MSA	3,175,275
5	Baltimore-Columbia-Towson, MD MSA	2,844,510
6	Orlando-Kissimmee-Sanford, FL MSA	2,673,376
7	Charlotte-Concord-Gastonia, NC-SC MSA	2,660,329
8	Virginia Beach-Norfolk-Newport News, VA-NC MSA	1,799,674
9	Jacksonville, FL MSA	1,605,848
10	Raleigh-Cary, NC MSA	1,413,982

== Politics ==
Parties
Nonpartisan	Democratic-Republican	Democratic	Nullifier	Whig	Republican	Liberal Republican	Dixiecrat	American Independent

- **Bold** denotes election winner.
- Note: Election results for the Upper South Atlantic States (Delaware, Maryland, Virginia, West Virginia and Washington, D.C.) are included in the table of the Mid-Atlantic states article.

Presidential electoral votes in the Lower South Atlantic States since 1789
Year	Florida	Georgia	North Carolina	South Carolina
1789	No election	**Washington**	No election	**Washington**
1792	No election	**Washington**	**Washington**	**Washington**
1796	No election	Jefferson	Jefferson	Jefferson
1800	No election	**Jefferson**	**Jefferson**	**Jefferson**
1804	No election	**Jefferson**	**Jefferson**	**Jefferson**
1808	No election	**Madison**	**Madison**	**Madison**
1812	No election	**Madison**	**Madison**	**Madison**
1816	No election	**Monroe**	**Monroe**	**Monroe**
1820	No election	**Monroe**	**Monroe**	**Monroe**
1824	No election	Crawford	Jackson	Jackson
1828	No election	**Jackson**	**Jackson**	**Jackson**
1832	No election	**Jackson**	**Jackson**	Floyd
1836	No election	White	**Van Buren**	Magnum
1840	No election	**Harrison**	**Harrison**	Van Buren
1844	No election	**Polk**	Clay	**Polk**
1848	**Taylor**	**Taylor**	**Taylor**	Cass
1852	**Pierce**	**Pierce**	**Pierce**	**Pierce**
1856	**Buchanan**	**Buchanan**	**Buchanan**	**Buchanan**
1860	Breckinridge	Breckinridge	Breckinridge	Breckinridge
1864	No election	No election	No election	No election
1868	**Grant**	Seymour	**Grant**	**Grant**
1872	**Grant**	Brown	**Grant**	**Grant**
1876	**Hayes**	Tilden	Tilden	**Hayes**
1880	Hancock	Hancock	Hancock	Hancock
1884	**Cleveland**	**Cleveland**	**Cleveland**	**Cleveland**
1888	Cleveland	Cleveland	Cleveland	Cleveland
1892	**Cleveland**	**Cleveland**	**Cleveland**	**Cleveland**
1896	Bryan	Bryan	Bryan	Bryan
1900	Bryan	Bryan	Bryan	Bryan
1904	Parker	Parker	Parker	Parker
1908	Bryan	Bryan	Bryan	Bryan
1912	**Wilson**	**Wilson**	**Wilson**	**Wilson**
1916	**Wilson**	**Wilson**	**Wilson**	**Wilson**
1920	Cox	Cox	Cox	Cox
1924	Davis	Davis	Davis	Davis
1928	**Hoover**	Smith	**Hoover**	Smith
1932	**Roosevelt**	**Roosevelt**	**Roosevelt**	**Roosevelt**
1936	**Roosevelt**	**Roosevelt**	**Roosevelt**	**Roosevelt**
1940	**Roosevelt**	**Roosevelt**	**Roosevelt**	**Roosevelt**
1944	**Roosevelt**	**Roosevelt**	**Roosevelt**	**Roosevelt**
1948	**Truman**	**Truman**	**Truman**	Thurmond
1952	**Eisenhower**	Stevenson	Stevenson	Stevenson
1956	**Eisenhower**	Stevenson	Stevenson	Stevenson
1960	Nixon	**Kennedy**	**Kennedy**	**Kennedy**
1964	**Johnson**	Goldwater	**Johnson**	Goldwater
1968	**Nixon**	Wallace	**Nixon**	**Nixon**
1972	**Nixon**	**Nixon**	**Nixon**	**Nixon**
1976	**Carter**	**Carter**	**Carter**	**Carter**
1980	**Reagan**	Carter	**Reagan**	**Reagan**
1984	**Reagan**	**Reagan**	**Reagan**	**Reagan**
1988	**Bush**	**Bush**	**Bush**	**Bush**
1992	Bush	**Clinton**	Bush	Bush
1996	**Clinton**	Dole	Dole	Dole
2000	**Bush**	**Bush**	**Bush**	**Bush**
2004	**Bush**	**Bush**	**Bush**	**Bush**
2008	**Obama**	McCain	**Obama**	McCain
2012	**Obama**	Romney	Romney	Romney
2016	**Trump**	**Trump**	**Trump**	**Trump**
2020	Trump	**Biden**	Trump	Trump
2024	**Trump**	**Trump**	**Trump**	**Trump**
Year	Florida	Georgia	North Carolina	South Carolina
