= Gompers v. United States =

- Supreme Court of the United States

Argued January 8–9, 1914 Reargued April 20–21, 1914 Decided May 11, 1914
- Full case name: Samuel Gompers, John Mitchell, and Frank Morrison v. United States
- Citations: 233 U.S. 604 (more) 34 S. Ct. 693; 58 L. Ed. 1115

Case history
- Prior: In re Gompers, 40 App. D.C. 293 (D.C. Cir. 1913)

Holding
- Contempt of court is a crime to which a statute of limitations applies.

Court membership
- Chief Justice Edward D. White Associate Justices Joseph McKenna · Oliver W. Holmes Jr. William R. Day · Horace H. Lurton; Charles E. Hughes · Willis Van Devanter; Joseph R. Lamar · Mahlon Pitney

Case opinions
- Majority: Holmes
- Dissent: Van Devanter
- Dissent: Pitney

Gompers v. United States, 233 U.S. 604 (1914), was a contempt of court case decided by the Supreme Court of the United States.

== Background ==
Before 1932, the courts attempted to control the activities of labor unions by issuing injunctions that forbade strikes and picketing. Around the turn of the century labor unions began increasingly to use boycotts against individual employers to force them to provide improved working conditions and higher wages. The courts attempted to stop the boycotts by using antilabor injunctions.

Samuel Gompers was the first president of the American Federation of Labor (AFL), holding the office from 1886 to 1924. Gompers and two other labor leaders were convicted of violating an antiboycott injunction for running a notice in its magazine listing Buck's Stove & Range Company along with other companies under the heading "We Don't Patronize." On May 25, 1911, the Supreme Court ruled on the case Gompers v. Buck's Stove & Range Company. The Court refused to reexamine the validity of the injunction issued by the lower court and rejected Gompers' claim that the First Amendment protected his activities. However, the convictions were reversed on the ground that the contempts were civil but the lower court had treated them as criminal in nature. The aim of civil contempt is remediation while the purpose of criminal contempt is punitive.

Although the Court had dismissed the charges in Gompers v. Buck's Stove & Range Company, the Supreme Court of the District of Columbia retained the power to punish contempt, if any had been committed against it. The day after the decision, this court appointed a committee to see if there was reasonable cause to believe that Gompers was guilty of willfully violating an injunction issued by the court on 18 December 1907.

On June 26, 1911, the committee reported that Gompers was guilty of violating the injunction. Rules to show cause were issued that day requiring each of the defendants to show why they should not be adjudged to be in contempt and be punished for it. Gompers pleaded the statute of limitations and not guilty to most of the charges. A trial took place, the statute of limitations was held inapplicable, and Gompers was found guilty and sentenced to prison for 12 months. The court of appeals reduced the sentence to imprisonment for 30 days.

Gompers appealed to the Supreme Court, arguing that the alleged contempt took place more than three years before the proceedings began and was therefore beyond the statute of limitations.

== Decision ==
The Court reversed the decision of the lower court based on its holding that criminal contempt was a crime to which the statute of limitations applies.

== Significance ==
The Court settled whether contempt was actually a crime by the affirmative. It also resolved the issue of a statute of limitations for punishing contempt, settling on a term of three years.

== See also ==
- Gompers v. Buck's Stove & Range Co.
