= John Clinton Gray =

American judge (1843–1915)

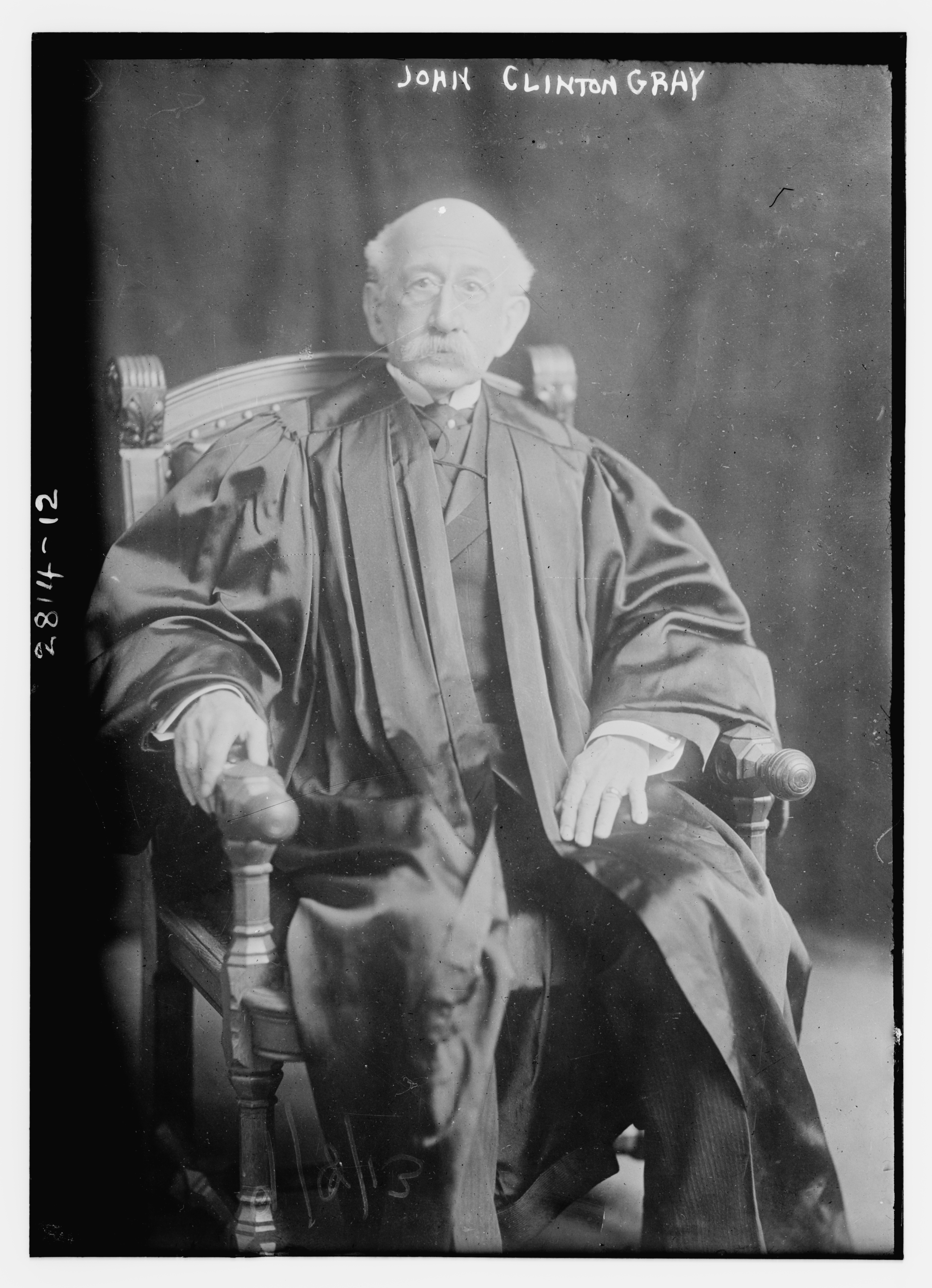
- Photograph of Gray, c. 1913

Judge of the New York Court of Appeals
- In office January 1888 – 1913
- Preceded by: Charles A. Rapallo

Personal details
- Born: December 4, 1843
- Died: June 28, 1915 (aged 71)
- Relations: George Zabriskie Gray (brother)
- Parent(s): John A. C. Gray; Susan Maria Zabriskie
- Education: University of Berlin
- Alma mater: New York University; Harvard Law School

John Clinton Gray (December 4, 1843 – June 28, 1915) was an American lawyer and politician from New York.

== Early life ==
Gray was born on December 4, 1843, in New York City. He was the son of wholesale dry goods dealer John Alexander Clinton Gray (1815–1898) and Susan Maria (née Zabriskie) Gray (1814–1904). His siblings were George Zabriskie Gray (dean of Episcopal Theological School in Cambridge), and his sister, Katharine Gray (wife of Hackley Bartholomew Bacon) and Frances Susan Gray. He was of French-Huguenot and Polish descent.

He was educated in Paris and at the University of Berlin. He graduated A.B. from New York University in 1865. Then he studied law at Harvard University and graduated LL.B. in 1866. In 1868, he received the degree of A.M. from New York University.

== Career ==
After his graduation from Harvard, Gray went to New York City where he began practicing law becoming a member of the law firm of Davis, Eaton & Taylor. Later, he became the senior member of Gray & Davenport, where he focused on corporate law.

In January 1888, he was appointed by Governor David B. Hill to the New York Court of Appeals to fill the vacancy caused by the death of Charles A. Rapallo. Until c. 1884, Gray was a Republican, when he became a Democrat, but reportedly, he was uninterested in politics. In November 1888, he was elected on the Democratic ticket to a full fourteen-year term, was re-elected in 1902, and remained on the bench until the end of 1913 when he reached the constitutional age limit of 70 years.

He is known for his strict constructivist dissent in the 1889 probate case of Riggs v. Palmer, where he argued against disinheriting a murder who benefitted from his victim's will because of a statute expressly forbidding the revocation or alteration of wills. Gray authored another notable dissent in 1903 in Roberson v. Rochester Folding Box Co., in which he sided with an employee suing her employer for using her likeness in an advertising pamphlet without her permission. He argued for the court to recognize an equitable right to privacy.

In 1913, Harvard conferred the honorary title of LL.D. on him.

== Personal life ==
Gray was married to Henrietta Pauline "Etta" Gunther (1848–1883), a daughter of William Henry Gunther. Before her death in 1883, they were the parents of five children:

- Pauline Gray (1873–1954), who married Dr. Burr Ferguson in 1899. They divorced and she married Thomas Franklin Witherspoon in 1906.
- Henry Gunther Gray (1875–1954), a Deputy District Attorney in New York County under William T. Jerome; he married Edith Florence Deacon, daughter of Edward Parker Deacon and sister of Gladys Spencer-Churchill, Duchess of Marlborough, in 1916.
- Edith Romeyn Gray (1880–1964), who married Robert Stockwell Reynolds Hitt, a son of U.S. Representative Robert R. Hitt, in 1902.
- Albert Zabriskie Gray (1881–1964), who married Marian Anthon Fish (1880–1944), a daughter of Mamie Fish and Stuyvesant Fish, in 1907. They divorced in 1934.
- Austen Gray (1881–1954), who married Grace Eaton.

After the death of his first wife, he married Grace Townsend (née Hawkshurst) Smith Turnbull (1846–1930), who was born on Staten Island. Grace, the widow of both James R. Smith and Henry Turnbull, was a daughter of William Hawkshurst and Sarah (née Townsend) Hawkshurst.

He was a member of the National Academy of Design, the American Museum of Natural History, the New-York Historical Society, the New York State Bar Association, and the Metropolitan Club. In New York, Gray lived at 5 East 56th Street and for many years was a prominent member of the "summer colony of Newport" but sold his estate there a few years before his death.

Gray died from "paralysis" and pneumonia on June 28, 1915, while spending the summer vacation at the Pinard cottage in Newport, Rhode Island. After a funeral at St. Bartholomew's Church was buried at Woodlawn Cemetery in the Bronx. His widow Grace died in 1930.

=== Descendants ===
Through his eldest son Henry, he was a grandfather of three granddaughters: Audrey Gray (who married John R. Chapin Jr. in 1950); Beatrice D. Milo Gray (who married Austen T. Gray in 1941); and Alison Evelyn Gray (who married John F. Murray Jr. in 1948).

Through his son Albert, he was a grandfather of Marian Stuyvesant Gray (who married Edward Fiedler Livingston Bruen in 1942).

Through his eldest daughter Edith, he was a grandfather of Robert R. Hitt (who married Evelyn Bigelow Clark in 1932).
