= Alton B. Parker =

American judge (1852–1926)

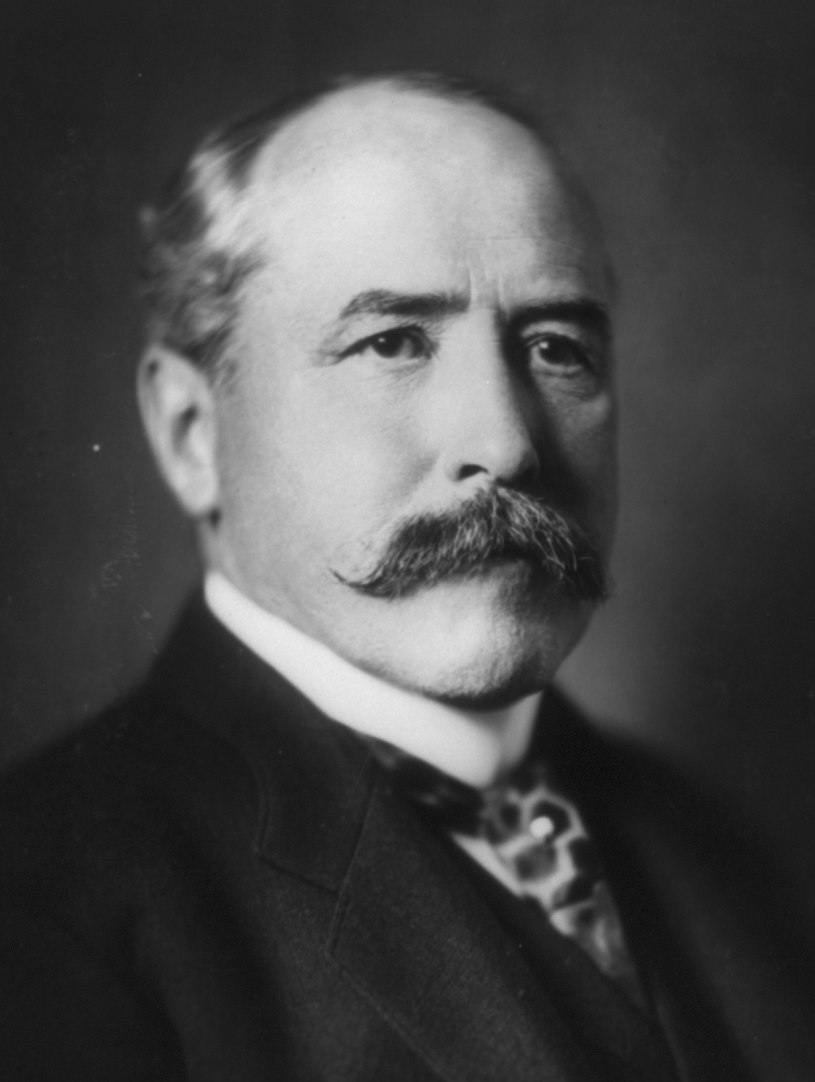
- Parker in 1906

Chief Judge of the New York Court of Appeals
- In office January 1, 1898 – August 5, 1904
- Preceded by: Charles Andrews
- Succeeded by: Edgar M. Cullen

Personal details
- Born: Alton Brooks Parker; May 14, 1852 Cortland, New York, U.S.
- Died: May 10, 1926 (aged 73) New York City, New York, U.S.
- Resting place: Wiltwyck Cemetery
- Party: Democratic
- Spouse(s): Mary Schoonmaker (m. 1872; died 1917) Amy Day Campbell (m. 1923)
- Education: Albany Law School (LLB)

Alton Brooks Parker (May 14, 1852 – May 10, 1926) was an American judge. He was the Democratic nominee in the 1904 United States presidential election, losing in a landslide to incumbent Republican Theodore Roosevelt.

A native of upstate New York, Parker practiced law in Kingston, New York, before being appointed to the New York Supreme Court and elected to the New York Court of Appeals. He served as Chief Judge of the latter from 1898 to 1904, when he resigned to run for president. In 1904, he defeated liberal publisher William Randolph Hearst for the Democratic Party nomination for President of the United States. In the general election, Parker opposed popular incumbent Republican President Theodore Roosevelt. After a disorganized and ineffective campaign, Parker was defeated by 336 electoral votes to 140, carrying only the traditionally Democratic Solid South. He then returned to practicing law.

In later life, he managed John Alden Dix's successful 1910 campaign for Governor of New York and served as prosecution counsel for the 1913 impeachment of Dix's successor, Governor William Sulzer. During the 1912 presidential election, Parker joined with other constitutional conservatives in an absolute defense of the power of judicial review against critics like Theodore Roosevelt or William Jennings Bryan who advocated a popular check on judicial decisions.

== Early life ==
Parker was born in Cortland, New York, to John Brooks Parker, a farmer, and Harriet F. Stratton. Both of his parents were well educated and encouraged his reading from an early age. At the age of 12 or 13, Parker watched his father serve as a juror and was so fascinated by the proceedings that he resolved to become a lawyer. He attended Cortland Academy, and left to begin working as a teacher in Binghamton. There he became engaged to Mary Louise Schoonmaker, the daughter of a man who owned property near his school. He then returned to Cortland Academy.

After graduation, he attended the State Normal School in Cortland (now the State University of New York College at Cortland), where he became a member of Gamma Sigma Fraternity. Parker married Schoonmaker in 1872 and became a clerk at Schoonmaker & Hardenburgh, a legal firm at which one of her relatives was the senior partner. He then enrolled at Albany Law School. After graduating with an LL.B. degree in 1873, he practiced law in Kingston until 1878 as the senior partner of the firm Parker & Kenyon.

Parker also became active with the Democratic Party. In 1877, he won election as surrogate court judge of Ulster County, and he was elected to a new six-year term in 1883. He served as a delegate to the 1880 and 1884 Democratic national conventions. In between the two conventions, he helped Grover Cleveland get elected Governor of New York in 1882. At the 1884 convention, he supported Cleveland, who was named the party's presidential nominee; Cleveland went on to narrowly defeat Republican James G. Blaine in the fall election. The new president offered Parker the position of first assistant postmaster general, but Parker rejected the offer, citing monetary reasons. During this time, Parker also became a protege of David B. Hill, managing Hill's 1885 gubernatorial campaign.

== Judicial career ==
After his election, Hill appointed Parker to fill an 1885 vacancy on the New York Supreme Court created by the death of Justice Theodore R. Westbrook. In 1886, Parker was elected to his own fourteen-year term in the seat. The Republicans declined to nominate a candidate to run against Parker. Three years later, Parker became an appellate judge when Hill appointed him to the newly formed Second Department of the Appellate Division. In November 1897, Parker successfully ran for the post of Chief Judge of the Court of Appeals, defeating Republican William James Wallace.

As a judge, Parker was notable for independently researching each case that he heard. He was considered to be pro-labor and was an active supporter of social reform legislation, for example upholding a maximum-hours law as constitutional. His judicial opinions were noted "for their forceful diction, comprehensive grasp of the fundamental questions involved, unsparing labor in citing precedents, close reasoning, and their tendency to disregard merely technicalities."

During his time as Chief Judge, Parker and his wife sold their Kingston home and bought an estate in Esopus on the Hudson River, calling the house "Rosemount". They were the parents of two children, Bertha and John. John died of tetanus while still a child. Bertha Schoonmaker Parker married the Reverend Charles Mercer Hall, with whom she had two children, Alton Parker Hall and Mary McAlister Hall Oxholm.

=== Notable cases ===
- In the landmark Hamer v. Sidway (1891) case, Parker held that forbearance (voluntarily abstaining) of legal rights on promises of future benefit made by other parties can constitute valid consideration for the purposes of forming a contract. Parker's Hamer opinion also held that unilateral contracts were valid under New York law.
- In Roberson v. Rochester Folding Box Co (1902), Parker held against Abigail Roberson, a teenager whose face had been used in advertisements without her permission. Parker held that this use did not violate her common law privacy rights. The decision was unpopular in the press and led to the passage of a privacy law by the New York State Legislature the following year.
- In People v. Place (1902), Parker wrote an opinion upholding the death sentence given to convicted murderer Martha Place, who became the first woman to be executed by electric chair.

== Presidential nomination ==
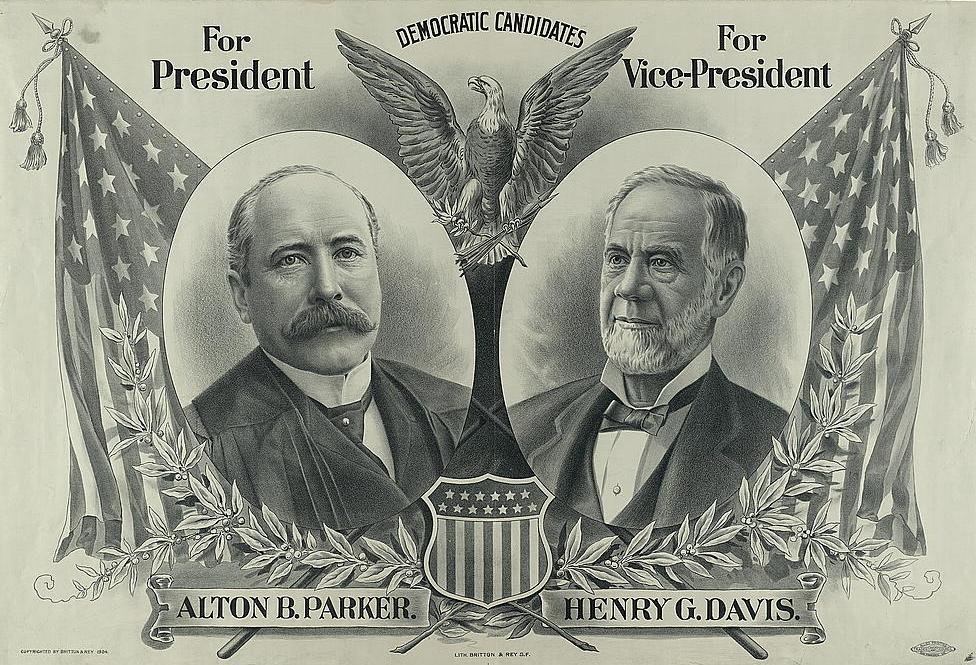
Parker/Davis campaign poster

As the 1904 presidential election approached, the Democrats began to search for a nominee to oppose popular incumbent Republican president Theodore Roosevelt, and Parker's name arose as a possible candidate. Roosevelt's Secretary of War Elihu Root said of Parker that he "has never opened his mouth on any national question", but Roosevelt feared that the man's neutrality would prove a political advantage, writing that "the neutral-tinted individual is very apt to win against the man of pronounced views and active life".

The 1904 Democratic National Convention was held in July in St. Louis, Missouri, then also hosting the 1904 World's Fair and the 1904 Summer Olympics. Parker's mentor David B. Hill—having attempted and failed to capture the nomination himself at the 1892 convention—now led the campaign for his protege's nomination. William Jennings Bryan, who had been nominated but defeated by William McKinley in both 1896 and 1900, was no longer considered by delegates to be a viable alternative. Radicals in the party supported publisher William Randolph Hearst but lacked sufficient numbers to secure the nomination due to opposition from Bryan and Tammany Hall, the powerful New York political machine. Small clusters of delegates pledged support to other candidates, including Missouri Senator Francis Cockrell; Richard Olney, Grover Cleveland's Secretary of State; Edward C. Wall, a former Wisconsin State Representative; and George Gray, a former Senator from Delaware. Other delegates spoke of nominating Cleveland, who had already served two nonconsecutive terms, but Cleveland was no longer popular outside the party or even within it, due to his rift with Bryan.

Parker's long service on the bench proved to be an advantage in his nomination, as he had avoided taking stands on issues that divided the party, particularly that of currency standards. Hill and other Parker supporters remained deliberately silent on their candidate's beliefs. By the time the convention cast their votes, it was clear that no candidate but Parker could unify the party, and he was selected on the first ballot. Henry G. Davis, an elderly West Virginia millionaire and former senator, was selected as the vice presidential candidate in the hope that he would partially finance Parker's campaign.

The convention was driven by debate over whether to include a free silver plank in the campaign's platform, opposing the gold standard and calling for the government to mint large numbers of silver dollars. The "free silver" movement, a key plank for the party in 1896 and 1900, was popular among indebted Western farmers who felt that inflation would help them repay their debts. Business interests, in contrast, supported the lower inflation of the gold standard. Bryan, famous for his 1896 "Cross of Gold" speech opposing the gold standard, fought bitterly to avoid the inclusion of the gold standard in the party platform in 1904. Ultimately the convention agreed not to include a plank on the subject.

However, seeking to win the support of the Eastern "sound money" faction, Parker sent a telegram to the convention immediately upon hearing news of his nomination that he considered the gold standard "firmly and irrevocably established" and would decline the nomination if he could not state this in his campaign. The telegram sparked a new debate and fresh opposition from Bryan, but the convention eventually replied to Parker that he was free to speak on the issue as he liked. National support for Parker began to rise, and Roosevelt praised his opponent's telegram in private as "bold and skillful" and "most adroit".

== Campaign ==
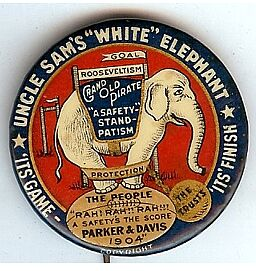
A Parker 1904 button attacking Republicans as tied to big business ("trusts").

After receiving the nomination, Parker resigned from the bench. On August 10, he was formally visited at Rosemount by a delegation of party elders to inform him of his nomination. Parker then delivered a speech criticizing Roosevelt for his administration's involvement in Turkish and Moroccan affairs and having failed to give a date on which the Philippines would become independent of American control. The speech was considered even by supporters to be impersonal and uninspiring. Historian Lewis L. Gould described the speech as a "fiasco" for Parker from which the candidate did not recover. After this initial speech, Parker retreated into a strategy of silence again, avoiding comment on all major issues.

Parker's campaign soon proved to be poorly run as well. Parker and his advisors opted for a front porch campaign, in which delegations would be brought to Rosemount to see Parker speak on the model of McKinley's successful 1896 campaign. However, due to Esopus's remote location and the campaign's inefficient use of funds to bring in delegates, Parker received few visitors. Rather than introducing issues that would differentiate the two parties, the Democrats preferred to emphasize Roosevelt's character, portraying him as dangerously unstable. Parker's campaign also failed to reach out to traditional Democratic voting blocs such as Irish Catholic immigrants. In contrast, Roosevelt's campaign, headed by George Cortelyou, organized committees to appeal specifically to demographics including Jewish, black, and German-American voters. John Hay, Roosevelt's Secretary of State, wrote of Parker's poor showing to Henry Adams, calling it "the most absurd political campaign of our time".

A month before the election, Parker became aware of the large volume of corporate donations Cortelyou had solicited for the Roosevelt campaign, and made "Cortelyouism" a theme of his speeches, accusing the president of being insincere in previous trust busting efforts. In late October, he also went on a speaking tour in the key states of New York and New Jersey, in which he reiterated the president's "shameless exhibition of a willingness to make compromise with dignity". Roosevelt, enraged, released a statement calling Parker's criticisms "monstrous" and "slanderous".

Parker's attacks came too late to turn the election, however. On November 8, Roosevelt won in a landslide of 7,630,457 votes to Parker's 5,083,880. Roosevelt carried every Northern and Western state, including Missouri, for a total of 336 electoral votes; Parker carried only the traditionally Democratic Solid South, accumulating 140 electoral votes. Parker telegraphed his congratulations to Roosevelt that night and returned to private life.

In Irving Stone's 1943 book, They Also Ran, about defeated presidential candidates, the author stated that Parker was the only defeated presidential candidate in history never to have a biography written about him. Stone theorized that Parker would have been an effective president and the 1904 election was one of a few in American history in which voters had two first-rate candidates to choose from. Stone professed that Americans liked Roosevelt more because of his colorful style.

== Later life ==
=== Legal career ===
After the election, Parker resumed practicing law and served as the president of the American Bar Association from 1906 to 1907. He was a founding member of the New York County Lawyers' Association and served as the group's president from 1909 to 1912. Parker was elected president of the New York State Bar Association on January 28, 1913. He served as the president of the NYSBA from 1913 to 1914.

Parker represented organized labor in several cases, most notably in Loewe v. Lawlor, popularly known as the "Danbury Hatters' case". In the case, the fur hat manufacturer D. E. Loewe & Company had attempted to enforce an open shop policy; when unions had subsequently boycotted the company, it sued the United Hatters of North America for violation of the Sherman Antitrust Act. The U.S. Supreme Court found for Loewe by ruling that the union had been acting in restraint of interstate commerce. Parker had more success representing Samuel Gompers and other labor leaders in Gompers v. United States, in which the Supreme Court overturned their convictions for contempt of court on statute of limitations grounds.

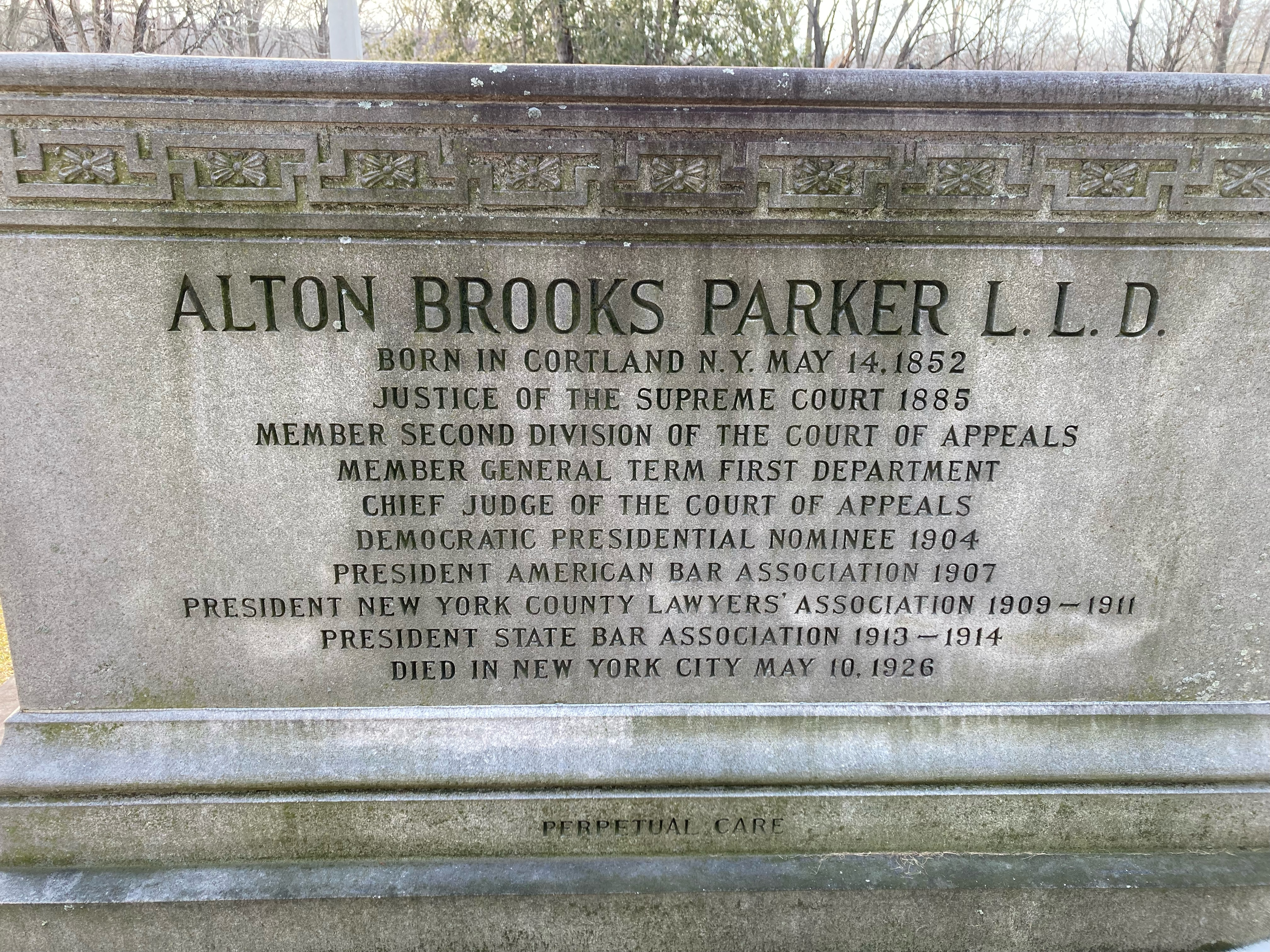
Alton B. Parker's headstone in Wiltwyck Cemetery

In 1913, Parker was appointed lead trial counsel in the impeachment of New York governor William "Plain Bill" Sulzer. Sulzer faced eight articles of impeachment, alleging that he made and filed a false statement regarding his campaign accounts, perjured himself in verifying the statement concerning his campaign accounts, bribed witnesses and fraudulently induced them to withhold evidence from the legislative committee investigating his misconduct, suppressed evidence by threatening witnesses, dissuaded a witness from appearing before the committee pursuant to a duly authorized subpoena, used campaign contributions to speculate in the stock market, promised and threatened to use his influence as governor to affect the votes or political actions of certain members of the general assembly and used his authority and influence as governor "to affect the current prices of securities listed and selling on the New York Stock Exchange." Sulzer was found guilty of three charges (making and filing a false statement regarding his campaign accounts, perjuring himself in verifying the statement concerning his campaign accounts and suppressing evidence by threatening witnesses) and was ultimately removed from office.

=== Political activity and the election of 1912 ===
Parker later re-entered politics, managing John Alden Dix's successful 1910 gubernatorial campaign. He announced his support for women's suffrage in 1911, telling a group of women lawyers that he supported the suffrage movement "most heartily." In 1913, he was counsel for the managers of the trial leading to the impeachment of Dix's successor as governor, William Sulzer.

During that election year, Parker actively resisted what he viewed as dangerous positions regarding the nation's judiciary held by men like Theodore Roosevelt, who initially sought the Republican nomination, and William Jennings Bryan, who still held considerable sway in the Democratic Party. Roosevelt had come out as early as 1910 in opposition to whom he called "fossilized judges" that struck down reform legislation as unconstitutional. By 1912, both Roosevelt and Bryan had called for amendments to enable the recall of judges and judicial decisions that the people at large deemed incorrect as a popular check on judicial review. Parker believed this proposal to be a danger to the nation's constitutional order, siding with conservatives in the GOP like William Howard Taft and Elihu Root to oppose Roosevelt's candidacy. Parker was elected to deliver the keynote address at the 1912 Democratic National Convention. He was elected against the opposition of Bryan, and the convention ultimately nominated Woodrow Wilson for president. While Wilson was more progressive than Parker's preferred candidate, Champ Clark, and held the endorsement of Bryan, he also came out against judicial recall. The result was the triumph of a supreme view of judicial review in both the Democratic and Republican parties.

=== Death ===
Parker's wife, Mary, died in 1917. He remarried in 1923 to Amelia Day "Amy" Campbell. On May 10, 1926, only a few days after recovering from bronchial pneumonia, Parker died from a heart attack while riding in his car through New York City's Central Park, four days before his 74th birthday. He was survived by Mrs. Charles Mercer Hall, his daughter from his first wife, two grandchildren, and his second wife. He was buried in Wiltwyck Cemetery in Kingston.

== Bibliography ==
- Dalton, Kathleen (October 8, 2002). Theodore Roosevelt: A Strenuous Life. Knopf Doubleday Publishing Group. ISBN 978-0-679-44663-7.
- Gould, Lewis L. (1991). The presidency of Theodore Roosevelt. University Press of Kansas. ISBN 978-0-7006-0435-7.
- Morris, Edmund (November 24, 2010). Theodore Rex. Random House Digital, Inc. ISBN 978-0-307-77781-2.
- Nahrstadt, Bradley C. (2024). Alton B. Parker: The Man Who Challenged Roosevelt. SUNY Press. ISBN 978-1-438-49597-2.
- Shoemaker, Fred C. "Alton B. Parker: the images of a gilded age statesman in an era of progressive politics" (MA thesis, The Ohio State University, 1983) online.
- Istre, Logan S. "Bench over Ballot: The Fight for Judicial Supremacy and the New Constitutional Politics, 1910–1916." The Journal of the Gilded Age and Progressive Era 20, no. 1 (2021): 2-23. doi:10.1017/S1537781420000079.

=== Primary sources ===
- Cunniff, M. G. (June 1904). "Alton Brooks Parker: The Probable Democratic Candidate for President". The World's Work: A History of Our Time. VIII: 4923–4932.

Legal offices
Preceded by Charles Andrews	Chief Judge of the New York Court of Appeals; 1898–1904	Succeeded by Edgar M. Cullen
Party political offices
Preceded by William Jennings Bryan	Democratic nominee for President of the United States; 1904	Succeeded by William Jennings Bryan
Preceded by Theodore Arlington Bell	Keynote speaker of the Democratic National Convention; 1912	Succeeded by Martin H. Glynn
