= Slayer rule =

Murderer cannot inherit from their victim

The slayer rule, in the U.S. law of inheritance, stops a person inheriting property from a person they murdered (so that, for example, a murderer cannot inherit from parents or a spouse they killed).

While a criminal conviction requires proof beyond a reasonable doubt, the slayer rule applies to civil law, not criminal law, so the petitioner must only prove the murder by a preponderance of the evidence, as in a wrongful death claim meaning on the civil standard of proof of the balance of probability. Hence, even a slayer who is acquitted of the crime of murder can lose the inheritance by the civil court running the estate.

So far, 47 states have codified the slayer statute, either by adopting the Uniform Probate Code (UPC) or a version of the code that includes the slayer statute.

== Statutory response to slayers ==
At common law, American courts used two different theories when dealing with early slayer cases. Some courts would disinherit the slayer because of the public policy principle that a slayer should not profit from his crime (No Profit theory).

=== No Profit theory ===
In Mutual Life v. Armstrong (1886), the first American case to consider the issue of whether a slayer could profit from their crime, the US Supreme Court set forth the No Profit theory (the term "No Profit" was coined by legal scholar Adam D. Hansen in an effort to distinguish early common law cases that applied a similar outcome when dealing with slayers), a public policy justification of slayer statutes: "It would be a reproach to the jurisprudence of the country if one could recover insurance money payable on the death of the party whose life he had feloniously taken."

Other courts were reluctant to disinherit a slayer in the absence of a legislatively codified statute directing the court to do so (Strict Construction theory).

=== Strict Construction theory ===
The Strict Construction theory (the term Strict Construction being coined by legal scholar Adam D. Hansen in an effort to distinguish this approach from earlier common law cases that dealt with similar situations involving the disinheritance of slayers) originated from Judge John Clinton Gray’s dissent in Riggs v. Palmer (1889). Judge Gray argued that the criminal law already established punishment for slayers, and that denying a slayer the estate would, in effect, impose significant further punishment beyond what was prescribed by statute. In his view, this was not something the court was permitted to do without an express, written law. The court, he contended, could not simply create or imagine such statutes in order to reach a morally pleasing result.

Slayer statutes codify the public policy principle that a murderer cannot profit from his crime. Slayer statutes provide a right of civil action to a victim's successors for the purpose of directing the victim's testate/intestate property away from the slayer. Such an action is brought by a successor, or other party of interest (e.g., life insurance company, bank), on behalf of the victim's estate. The slayer statute applies to both real and personal property that would have been acquired by intestacy or by will.

In 1936, legal scholar John W. Wade proposed a No Profit theory statutory fix to promote uniformity amongst the states in dealing with slayer cases. In 1969, the Uniform Law Commission included No Profit theory language in its first promulgation of the Uniform Probate Code (UPC). Forty-eight states have enacted laws that strip a slayer of any inheritance benefit he would have gained from his unlawful act.

== Regional details ==
=== United States ===
In the United States, most jurisdictions have enacted a slayer statute, which codifies the rule and supplies additional conditions. Such laws have sometimes been construed narrowly because the relevant statutes are criminal in nature, and serve to take away someone's rights that are otherwise afforded by law. Interpreted this way, a slayer statute will not prevent the killer from acquiring title to the property by other means. In jurisdictions with a common law slayer rule, a slayer statute may serve to extend and supplement the common law rule, rather than limiting it. For example, where the statute requires the heir to have been convicted to bar inheritance, a common law slayer rule that does not have this requirement may still serve to bar inheritance.

==== Arizona ====
In 2012, the Arizona legislature amended Arizona's slayer rule to include the lesser crime of manslaughter in an effort to subject more killers to civil disinheritance. Prior to the 2012 amendment, only killers found guilty of murder in the first or second degree would be disinherited under Arizona's slayer rule. Several specific cases (e.g., Grace Pianka; Douglas Grant; and Gilbert Ramos) prompted the Arizona legislature to amend Arizona's slayer rule by 1) expressly defining “intentional and felonious” to mean any individual who is found guilty of murder in the first or second degree, or the lesser crime of manslaughter; 2) allowing victims to place the decedent's estate in constructive trust immediately from the time of the killing; and 3) allowing the victims to place the slayer's estate (i.e., life insurance benefits) in constructive trust, in the case of murder-suicide. Arizona now touts its slayer rule as the strongest in the nation.

==== Florida ====
The Florida slayer rule prevents a murderer receiving the benefits they would otherwise be entitled to by the terms of the victim's will itself or by statute. Although a murder conviction is sufficient to invoke the rule, it is not required, and the court has discretion to determine by the greater weight of the evidence whether the surviving person intentionally killed or contributed to the killing of the decedent for the purposes of applying the rule.

Not only has Florida codified the slayer rule, but the Florida Statutes also contain a provision depriving a surviving person of the benefits of inheritance when convicted of abuse, neglect, exploitation, or the aggravated manslaughter of an elderly person or a disabled adult. However, conviction for the foregoing offenses only creates a rebuttable presumption, whereas a conviction for murder is conclusive for applicability of the slayer statute.

==== Illinois ====
A person found guilty of financial exploitation, abuse or neglect cannot inherit any benefit from their victim.

==== Kansas ====
Kansas prohibits a slayer's inheritance where suicide is shortly after the murder.

==== Maryland ====
The Maryland slayer rule is harsher than most other states. In addition to prohibiting murderers from inheriting from their victims, Maryland's slayer rule prohibits anyone else from inheriting from murder victims through their murderers; Maryland's slayer rule is thus similar in structure to corruption of blood.

For example, a mother leaves her son $50,000, and leaves her son's child (her grandchild) $100,000. She leaves her residuary estate (i.e., whatever else is left of the estate) to her daughter. If the son kills his mother, then under Maryland law, the son's child will inherit the $100,000; however the son's $50,000 (which is also the indirect inheritance of the grandchild through his father), is not available under Maryland law to either the son, or his child. The $50,000 becomes part of the mother's residuary estate and goes to the daughter.

==== Missouri ====
The Missouri slayer rule only exists in common law. It has not been codified. There has not been a proposed slayer statute by the legislature in recent years. The Missouri Supreme Court found a slayer statute to be unnecessary in Lee v. Aylward, when determining whether contingent beneficiaries, children of the slayer, or the next of kin should be the heirs of the victim's estate. The court's holding relied on the Model Probate Code and several jurisdictions favoring the contingent beneficiaries, and assuming the victim would disfavor the children of the slayer would call for "inappropriate speculation." Although the Supreme Court of Missouri references the Model Probate Code in Lee, the Model Probate Code has not been adopted by Missouri legislation.

==== Texas ====
Texas law states "No conviction shall work corruption of blood or forfeiture of estate." However, if a beneficiary of a life insurance policy or contract is convicted and sentenced (including accomplices) in willfully bringing about the death of the insured, proceeds are then paid in accordance with the Texas Insurance Code.

==== Washington ====
A person found guilty of financial exploitation, abuse or neglect cannot inherit any benefit from their victim.

=== United Kingdom ===
A similar principle in the United Kingdom is governed by the Forfeiture Act 1982.

=== South Africa ===
The Roman-Dutch law of South Africa includes a similar principle known as de bloedige hand neemt geen erfenis (the bloody hand does not inherit).

== See also ==
- Riggs v. Palmer
- Osete, Jesus (5 August 2017). "Extending the 'Slayer Rule' to Four-Legged Legatees". J. Animal & Envtl. L. doi:10.2139/ssrn.2720019. SSRN 2720019.
