= Living instrument doctrine =

European Court of Human Rights interpretation

The living instrument doctrine is a method of judicial interpretation developed and used by the European Court of Human Rights to interpret the European Convention on Human Rights in light of present-day conditions. The doctrine was first articulated in Tyrer v. United Kingdom (1978), and has led both to different rulings on certain issues as well as evaluating the human rights implications of new technologies.

== Origin and development ==
The living instrument doctrine has been used from the beginning by the European Court of Human Rights. It was first articulated during the case Tyrer v. United Kingdom (1978). In Tyrer the court rejected the argument that because people in the Isle of Man approved of judicial corporal punishment, such could not be a violation of Article 3 of the European Convention on Human Rights. The judgement stated that "The Court must also recall that the Convention is a living instrument which, as the Commission rightly stressed, must be interpreted in the light of present-day conditions." It went on to say that the verdict was being made in the context of the outlawing of corporal punishment in other European countries.

Other early cases which helped develop the living instrument doctrine include Marckx v. Belgium (1979), in which the court decided that it was no longer justified to treat illegitimate children differently, and Dudgeon v United Kingdom (1981), in which the court judged "as compared with the era when that legislation was enacted, there is now a better understanding, and in consequence, an increased tolerance of homosexual behaviour to the extent that it is no longer considered to be necessary or appropriate" to criminalize homosexuality. According to law scholar George Letsas, these cases have a pattern: a case involving a moral issue comes to the Court, the Court notes the importance of the moral aspect in the member state, but also considers developments in other Council of Europe states. In most cases, this resulted in a violation of a Convention right being found.

In Mamatkulov and Askarov v. Turkey (2005), the court stated that it "upholds individual rights as practical and effective, rather than theoretical and illusory protections". The judgement for Demir and Baykara v. Turkey (2008) stated that the living instrument doctrine, in addition to being in light of present-day conditions, also meant interpretation "in accordance with developments in international law, so as to reflect the increasingly high standard being required in the area of the protection of human rights".

== Effects ==
Because the living instrument doctrine prioritizes whether there is a European consensus in a certain interpretation of a Convention obligation, it is closely related to the Convention interpretation concepts of autonomous concepts and margin of appreciation. In cases where the Court did not find a European consensus on a particular issue, such as Sheffield and Horsham v United Kingdom (1998) on the subject of sex-reassignment surgery, it was much less likely to find a violation because it considered that the state had a wide margin of appreciation on how to treat a given issue. In the early 2000s, the Court loosened its reliance on European consensus and began to consider a trend in member states' laws sufficient to find that present-day conditions had changed with regard to a particular issue according to the living instrument doctrine.

Areas in which the court considers that present-day conditions have evolved include gender equality, environmental regulation, and transgender rights. Letsas also finds differences in how blasphemy, sexual advice for adolescents, and obscenity are treated by the Court. The Court has given increased scrutiny to differential treatment exclusively based on ethnicity, gender, religion, or sexual orientation, which it is now more likely to label unjustified discrimination. In addition, with the proliferation of alternative family arrangements, the court has expanded its definition of family under Article 8, for example to same-sex couples, as in Oliari and Others v Italy (2015). Because of the living instrument doctrine, the Court has ruled on the human rights implications of technologies that did not exist when the Convention was drafted, on issues such as biotechnology, internet freedom, personal data, mass surveillance, and surrogacy.

== Reception ==
Supporters of the doctrine note that it is not prohibited by the treaty itself to take an expansive and/or evolutive interpretation of the rights enumerated therein. Stefan Thiel argues that the living instrument doctrine is allowed both by the Convention and relevant international law. Dutch judge Marc Bossuyt stated in a speech that the living instrument doctrine is "a Trojan horse for judicial activism, giving Strasbourg judges the liberty to find what they want to find in the interstices of Convention rights". Other critics argue that the state parties should only be bound by the original obligations as understood in 1950.

Sonja Grover argues that insisting on a originalist and/or conservative textualist understanding of Convention rights can also be considered a form of judicial activism which denies individuals the full exercise of their rights. According to Letsas, the living instrument doctrine is not activist because "contracting states have given the Court jurisdiction to protect whatever human rights people in fact have, and not what human rights domestic authorities or public opinion think people have". Accordingly, the Court should not give any more weight to majoritarian preferences across the entire Council of Europe area than within a particular state, and is justified in raising the threshold of human rights protection, despite the blowback it has received from certain rulings.

== Other uses ==
The living instrument doctrine has also been used by the United Nations Human Rights Committee and has been proposed with regards to the Charter of Fundamental Rights of the European Union.

== See also ==
- Living Constitution, similar doctrine in U.S. constitutional law
- Living tree doctrine – Canadian doctrine of constitutional interpretation
