= Constitution in Exile =

This article does not refer to The Constitution in Exile, a book by Judge Andrew Napolitano.

Constitution in Exile is a controversial term that refers to the situation resulting from provisions of the United States Constitution allegedly not having been enforced according to their "original intent" or "original meaning". Some originalists might argue, for example, that the Commerce Clause and Necessary and Proper Clause do not authorize economic legislation dating back to the New Deal.

== Origins and meaning ==
According to an article by Legal Affairs Editor Jeffrey Rosen in The New Republic, "The phrase comes from a 1995 article by Douglas Ginsburg, a federal appeals court judge in Washington, D.C., whom Ronald Reagan unsuccessfully nominated to the Supreme Court after the Senate rejected Bork."

According to the same article, reinstating provisions "exiled" from the Constitution would mean "reimposing meaningful limits on federal power that could strike at the core of the regulatory state for the first time since the New Deal. These justices could change the shape of laws governing the environment, workplace health and safety, anti-discrimination, and civil rights, making it difficult for the federal government" to act on these issues. Rosen considers this to be a form of judicial activism, though its proponents would argue that it was merely reversing decades of accumulated activism.

=== Rosen's argument ===
Rosen argues that one of the most important provisions of the Constitution in Exile is limitations on the interstate commerce clause, which were undermined by the Supreme Court's "expansive interpretation of Congress's power to regulate interstate commerce... extended to include any activities that might affect commerce indirectly" during the New Deal. "In 1995, however, the Supreme Court began taking tentative steps toward resurrecting some of the constitutional limitations on the regulatory state that had been dormant since the 1930s. In controversial 5–4 rulings (primarily, United States v. Lopez and United States v. Morrison), the Court limited Congress's power to ban guns in the area surrounding schools, for example, and to punish violence against women, holding that the laws did not involve commercial activities and therefore couldn't be justified by Congress's authority to regulate interstate commerce." (A later decision in Gonzales v. Raich, in which Justices Antonin Scalia and Anthony Kennedy – integral parts of the Lopez and Morrison majorities – joined, seemed to show the limits of the court's willingness to curtail commerce clause power.)

Most judges who are identified with the Constitution in Exile call themselves strict constructionists or originalists.

== Controversy surrounding the term ==
Law professors David Bernstein and Orin Kerr, among others, have criticized Rosen and Cass Sunstein, another opponent of the "Constitution in Exile," for using the term, which is now used almost exclusively as a pejorative. Kerr writes: "there is no evidence that a conservative has used the phrase 'Constitution in Exile' outside of a single reference in a 1995 book review." Bernstein writes that Sunstein and Rosen have invented a nonexistent cabal as a straw man:

I, as someone who knows probably just about every libertarian and most Federalist Society law professors in the United States (there aren't that many of us), and who teaches on the most libertarian law faculty in the nation, never heard the phrase [...] [T]he phrase "Constitution in Exile movement" implies that there is some organized group that has a specific platform. In fact, what you really have is a very loose-knit group of libertarian-oriented intellectuals with many disagreements among themselves.

Similarly, The Weekly Standard has noted that:

For years, liberal legal commentators have been fond of accusing conservatives of pining for the restoration of the "Constitution in Exile" — a return to pre-FDR conservative constitutional jurisprudence that would (by their telling) roll back the New Deal, the Great Society, and more or less every other major liberal legislative triumph of the twentieth century. But while Jeffrey Rosen, Linda Greenhouse, Jeffrey Toobin, Cass Sunstein, and others often invoked phrase, few if any conservative legal thinkers have actually employed the phrase affirmatively, other than one federal judge in a magazine article fifteen years ago.

=== Sunstein's view ===
Sunstein has responded that Randy Barnett's book, Restoring the Lost Constitution, Richard Epstein's constitutional work, and opinions expressed by Clarence Thomas and Antonin Scalia all support "restoring the lost constitution, or what Judge Ginsburg calls the Constitution in Exile," so his use of the term is justified.

== See also ==
- Legal formalism
- Living Constitution
- Rule according to higher law
- Lochner era
