= Government by Judiciary =

Book by Raoul Berger

- First edition
- Author: Raoul Berger
- Language: English
- Publisher: Harvard University Press
- Publication date: 1977
- Publication place: United States

Government by Judiciary is a 1977 book by constitutional scholar and law professor Raoul Berger. It argues that the U.S. Supreme Court, especially the Warren Court, has interpreted the Fourteenth Amendment of the U.S. Constitution contrary to the original intent of its framers and, in doing so, has usurped the American people's authority to govern themselves.

Berger contends that the Court has no power to rewrite the Constitution under the guise of interpretation, and that it has repeatedly done so in effect, leaving the text unchanged while altering its meaning.

== Summary ==
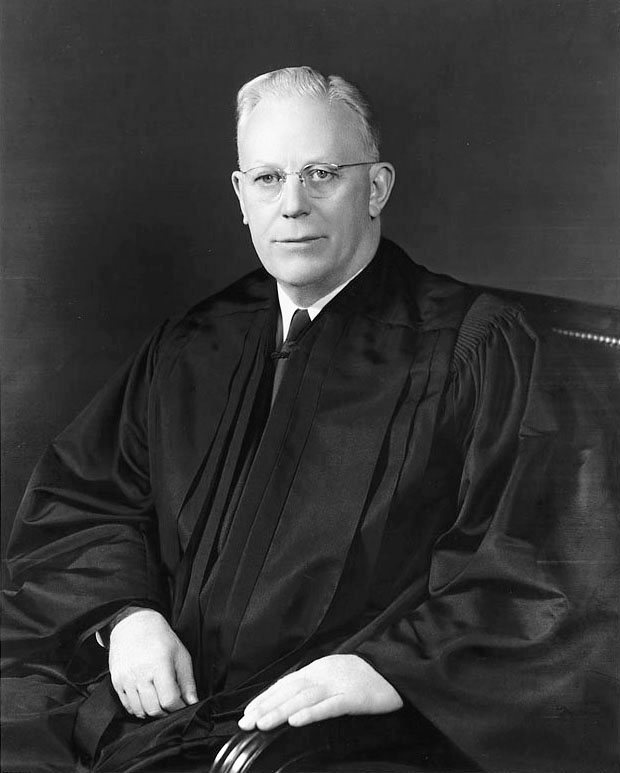
Earl Warren and the court that he led were huge targets of criticism in Government by Judiciary.

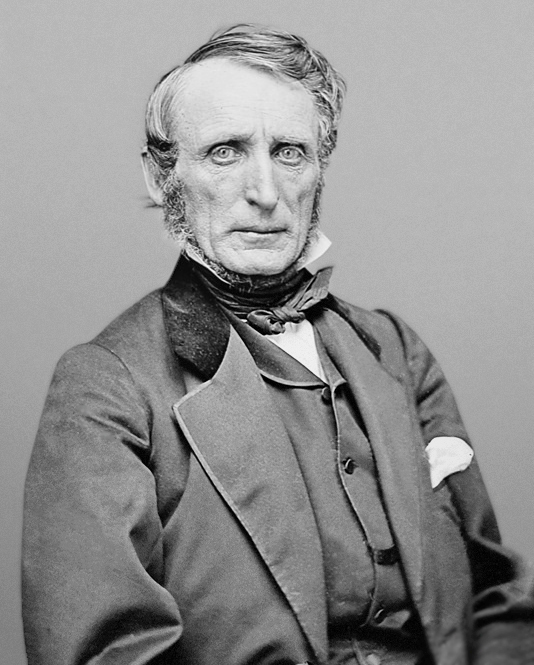
John Bingham, whose views in regards to incorporation were unorthodox according to Berger.

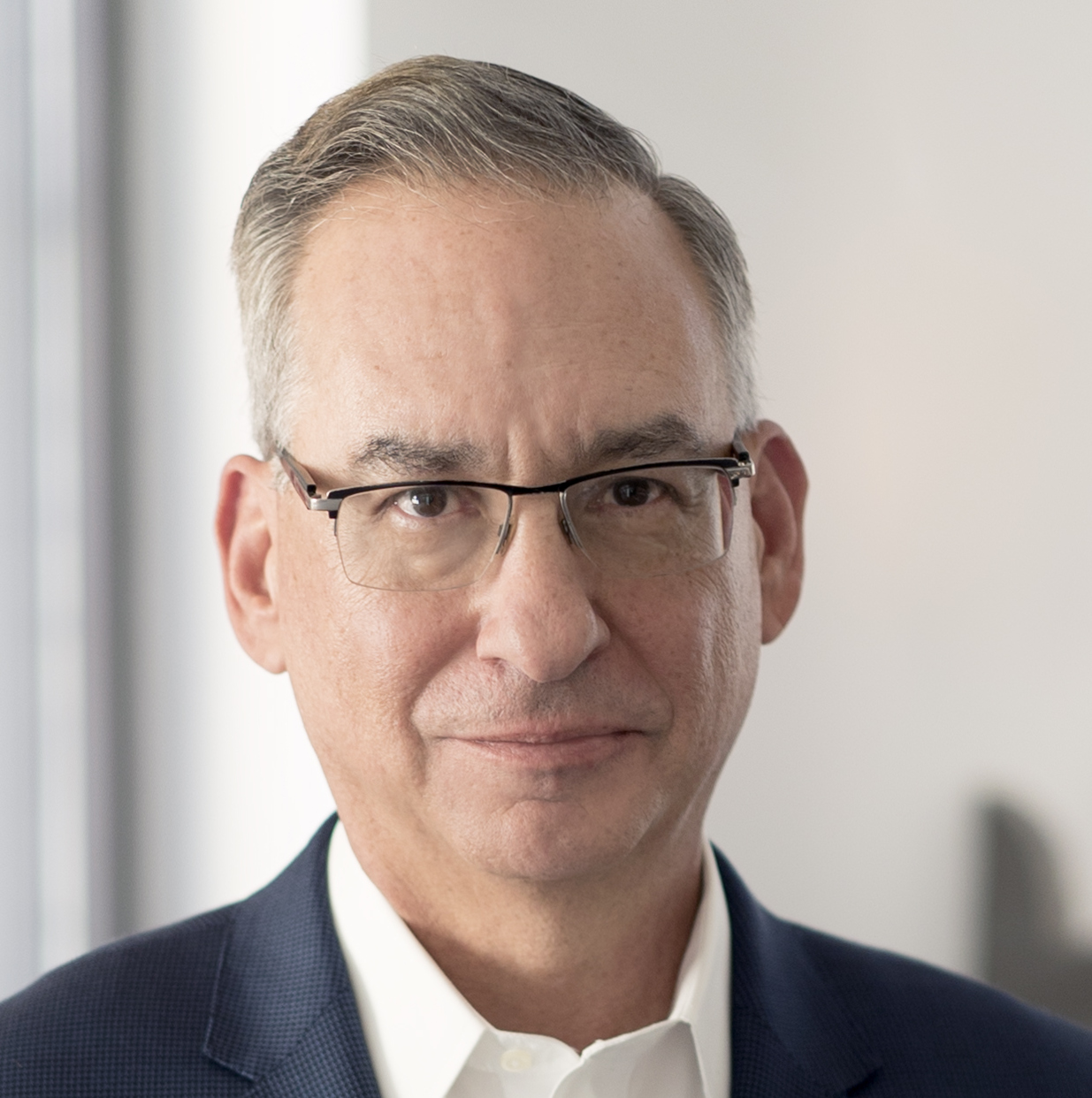
Randy Barnett is one of the people whom Berger responded to in his book.

Berger argues that the Fourteenth Amendment should be read according to the original intent of its framers. This, he says, is how the Constitution had always been interpreted, and how the amendment's authors expected their own text to be treated. Berger also argues that the Fourteenth Amendment's sole purpose was to constitutionalize the Civil Rights Act of 1866. He rejects broad readings built on statements by the amendment's opponents, arguing those statements deliberately exaggerated its reach in hopes of defeating it. That Act, he writes, was meant to abolish the Black Codes of the postwar South and to secure freedmen's basic rights: to contract, to sue and be sued, to travel and work freely, and to buy, sell, and own property.

In Berger's account, the framers did not understand the Act (or the amendment that constitutionalized it) to require states to let African Americans serve on juries, vote, marry across racial lines, or attend integrated schools. On that basis, he concludes that many of the Court's Fourteenth Amendment decisions were wrong, including Strauder v. West Virginia (1880) on jury service, Brown v. Board of Education (1954) on school segregation, one-person-one-vote cases such as Reynolds v. Sims, and Loving v. Virginia on interracial marriage.

Berger also criticizes the argument made by Alexander Bickel, William Van Alstyne, and others that the 14th Amendment's language was intended to be open-ended to give future generations broad discretion in determining its principles to their own times. Berger counters that the 'open-ended language' theory has no historical basis, and that intentions never disclosed to the ratifying public cannot govern an amendment's meaning.

Berger likewise rejects substantive due process and the incorporation of the Bill of Rights against the states as contrary to the framers' intent. He treats the statements of John Bingham and Jacob Howard, who said the amendment would apply the first eight amendments to the states, as unorthodox views that most Republicans in the 39th Congress did not share. He notes that no Republican campaigning before the 1866 elections suggested the amendment would incorporate the Bill of Rights and that courts continued to hold it inapplicable to the states after ratification in 1868.

Berger also defends the holding in Plessy v. Ferguson (1896), arguing that it "merely reiterated what an array of courts had been holding for fifty years," beginning with Roberts v. City of Boston (1849), which upheld segregated schools in Massachusetts. In his view, Plessy became a symbol of evil only because later generations "impose upon the past a creature of our own imagining."

Berger accepted constitutional change through the Article V amendment process but denied that the judiciary may amend the Constitution de facto under the guise of interpretation, even where formal amendment appears unrealistic. Not every injustice, he maintained, has a judicial remedy.

Berger argues that Congress, not the courts, holds exclusive authority to enforce the Fourteenth Amendment; the courts could act only under a congressional delegation. In the author's view, the courts would only be allowed to enforce the Fourteenth Amendment if the U.S. Congress were to delegate this authority to them. He notes that when the amendment was drafted and ratified, Northerners and abolitionists still distrusted judicial review, remembering antebellum pro-slavery rulings such as Prigg v. Pennsylvania and Dred Scott v. Sandford.

== Aftermath ==
After this book was published, Berger spent twenty years responding to his critics – writing "forty article-length rebuttals and one of book length." The scholars and law professors to whom Berger responded include (but are not limited to) John Hart Ely, Aviam Soifer, Louis Fisher, Michael Kent Curtis (author of Free Speech, "The People's Darling Privilege"), Paul Brest, Paul Dimond, Lawrence G. Sager, Mark Tushnet, Michael Perry, Gerald Lynch, Hugo Bedau, Robert Cottrol, Michael W. McConnell, H. Jefferson Powell, Jack Balkin, Leonard Levy, Stephen Presser, Michael Zuckert, Randy Barnett, Boris Bittker, Bruce Ackerman, Hans Baade, Akhil Amar, Jack Rakove, and Ronald Dworkin.

== Reception ==
After it was published, Government by Judiciary received reviews from publications such as Duke Law Journal, Valparaiso University Law Review, Cornell Law Review, Columbia Law Review, and Commentary. Since its publication in 1977, Government by Judiciary has been cited over 2,100 times.

== See also ==
- Originalism
- Living Constitution
