= Judicial minimalism =

Philosophy in US constitutional law

Judicial minimalism refers to a philosophy in United States constitutional law that promotes making decisions with minimal consequences outside of a given case or controversy. It was notably advocated by the Supreme Court Justice Sandra Day O'Connor. It is often compared to other judicial philosophies such as judicial activism, originalism, and textualism. Judicial minimalism takes its approach from a limited method of decision-making conceived by Edmund Burke.

Originally stated in Liverpool, New York & Philadelphia Steamship Co. v. Commissioners of Emigration (1885), minimalism is one the seven rules of the constitutional avoidance doctrine established in Ashwander v. Tennessee Valley Authority (1936) that requires that the Supreme Court of the United States to "not 'formulate a rule of constitutional law broader than is required by the precise facts to which it is to be applied.'"

== The minimalist viewpoint ==
Minimalists offer very small, case-specific interpretations of Constitutional Law as an alternative to what they see as the excesses of extremists on both sides. They believe that a stable Constitutional Law is in everybody's interest, and place great importance on the concept of precedent and stare decisis. They argue that only very small interpretations away from precedent, narrowly applied, and based on the general direction of society constitute true judicial restraint rather than any originalist or strict constructionist viewpoint (in opposition to conservatives), while still allowing for a Living Constitution (albeit one with a much slower adaptation than many liberals would like). Depending on the minimalist's particular preferences, a minimalist on the court would be likely to either very slowly bolster or chip away at abortion precedents rather than proclaim a lasting ban on or legalization of abortion via Constitutional rulings.

Justice Sandra Day O'Connor is often hailed by minimalists as their ideal Justice. In a concurring opinion in the 2011 Supreme Court case NASA v. Nelson, Justice Antonin Scalia derided minimalism as a "never-say-never disposition [which] does damage for several reasons". Justice Samuel Alito, writing for the majority, defended the Court's minimalist approach in choosing to "decide the case before us and leave broader issues for another day".

Chief Justice John G. Roberts has been said to operate under an approach of judicial minimalism in his decisions, having stated, "[i]f it is not necessary to decide more to a case, then in my view it is necessary not to decide more to a case."

== Summary and complaints against "judicial extremism" ==
Largely associated with Cass R. Sunstein, it is a viewpoint which criticizes the more conservative stance of originalism as being judicial activism in disguise. Minimalists believe that a faithful application of originalist theory would result in a system of constitutional law in which modern societal standards would be ignored, in favor of the now-antiquated opinions held by the Founding Fathers, probably including their views on gender equality, racism, and other things, which modern society would find objectionable. Minimalists claim that conservatives who subscribe to originalism are likely to ignore precedent where it is convenient for conservative political aims. Minimalists also criticize traditional liberal judicial activism as overexpansive and as ignorant of precedent when it is convenient to liberal political aims.

== See also ==
- Judicial restraint
- Cass Sunstein
