= Intentionalism (disambiguation) =

Intentionalism may refer to:

- Intentionalism, focus on original intent in constitutional and statutory interpretation
- Authorial intentionalism, focus on authorial intent in aesthetic interpretation
- Intentionalism (philosophy of mind)
- Functionalism versus intentionalism, a historiographical debate
