= Raoul Berger =

American legal scholar

Raoul Berger (January 4, 1901 – September 23, 2000) was an American legal scholar at the University of California at Berkeley and Harvard Law School. While at Harvard, he was the Charles Warren Senior Fellow in American Legal History. He is known for his role in the development of originalism.

== Early life and education ==
He emigrated to the United States with his family from Ukraine in 1904. He first pursued studies as a concert violinist at the Institute of Musical Art in New York that culminated in his joining the Cincinnati Symphony Orchestra as its 2nd Concert Master (1928-1932) and the 1st violinist of the Cincinnati String Quartet (1929-1932). After earning his A.B. from the University of Cincinnati in 1932, he abandoned his professional music career to study law at the Northwestern University School of Law, from which he graduated at age 35. He practiced law in Chicago before enrolling at Harvard Law School, where he earned his Master of Laws degree (LL.M.) in 1938.

== Career ==
Upon his graduation, Berger worked first for the Securities and Exchange Commission, then as Special Assistant to the U.S. Attorney General, and, finally, as Counsel to the Alien Property Custodian during World War II. Following the war, he entered private practice in Washington, D.C. where he remained until 1961.

== Professor ==
Berger began teaching law at the University of California, Berkeley, School of Law in 1962 as its Regents' Professor and later became the Charles Warren Senior Fellow in American Legal History at Harvard University School of Law from 1971 to 1976.

His notable work was in the area of constitutional scholarship. Berger has written extensively about Impeachment, executive privilege, and the Fourteenth Amendment.

Berger was a popular academic critic of the doctrine of "executive privilege" and his writings, according to professor Vincent Crapanzano, played a role in undermining President Richard Nixon's constitutional arguments during the 1973–74 impeachment process.

In 1977, Berger unleashed a firestorm of controversy within the legal academy with his next book, Government by Judiciary. In it, Berger claimed that the Warren Court's expansive interpretation of the Fourteenth Amendment alternately distorted and ignored the intentions of the framers of that amendment as disclosed by the historical record. Berger presented arguments that the framers of the Fourteenth Amendment did not intend it to forbid segregated schooling.

The book is widely credited as the first work of legal scholarship from an originalist perspective, although some originalists disagree with the conclusions Berger draws from the historical record. Berger further posited that the Warren Court expanded the authority of the judiciary without constitutional warrant.

Berger continued writing articles – often in response to his critics – until at least 1997. Berger died in 2000 at the age of 99.

== Bibliography ==
His publications include:

- Congress v. The Supreme Court (1969) ISBN 978-0-674-16210-5
- Impeachment: The Constitutional Problems (1972) ISBN 978-0-674-44475-1
- Executive Privilege: A Constitutional Myth (1974) ISBN 978-0-674-27425-9
- Government by Judiciary: The Transformation of the Fourteenth Amendment (1977) ISBN 978-0-674-35795-2
- Death Penalties: The Supreme Court's Obstacle Course (1982) ISBN 978-0-674-19426-7
- Federalism: The Founders' Design (1987) ISBN 978-0-8061-2059-1
- Selected Writings on the Constitution (1987) [with Philip Kurland] ISBN 978-0-940973-00-8
- The Fourteenth Amendment and the Bill of Rights (1989) ISBN 978-0-8061-2186-4

== See also ==
- originalism
- Living Constitution
