= Strict constructionism =

United States legal philosophy in which judges must interpret laws exactly as written

In the United States, strict constructionism is a particular legal philosophy of judicial interpretation that limits or restricts the powers of the federal government only to those expressly, i.e., explicitly and clearly, granted to the government by the United States Constitution. While commonly confused with textualism or originalism, they are not the same, and in fact frequently contradict, as textualists like Antonin Scalia have noted.

== Different uses ==
=== Strict meaning ===
Strict construction requires a judge to apply the text only as it is expressly written, i.e., read perfectly literally. This can contradict the commonly-understood meaning of a law. For example, consider a law that specifies "the use of a knife when committing a crime should be punished by ten years in prison." This would commonly be understood as prohibiting the use of a knife to threaten or injure another person. However, read purely literally, the law would also mandate ten years in prison for dining and dashing if the diner were to use a knife to cut their food.

As a result of this distinction, nearly all textualists reject strict constructionism in this sense. Supreme Court justice Antonin Scalia, a major proponent of textualism, said that "no one ought to be" a strict constructionist, because the most literal interpretation meaning of a text can conflict with the commonly-understood or original meaning. Similarly, many of the original framers of the Constitution were not strict constructionists; Washington, Hamilton, and Adams all took broad interpretations of the powers afforded to the federal government. An early attempt at limiting the federal government's powers to only those "expressly" granted by the constitution was rejected at the constitutional convention, as many of the Founding Fathers did not originally intend for the constitution to be read in this manner. However, some fathers not present at the convention, such as Thomas Jefferson, would later argue for a strict interpretation of federal powers. James Madison (the Constitution's primary author) tended to take a more moderate view, somewhere between the interpretations promoted by Jefferson and Adams.

=== Common use ===
"Strict constructionism" is also used in American political discourse as an umbrella term for conservative legal philosophies, which tend to be more willing to strike down federal laws and regulations for exceeding the authorities given to them by the constitution. One example of this is the major questions doctrine. The major questions doctrine limits the ability of the executive branch to enact broad or sweeping changes without express authorization from Congress, under the principle that few people would understand a vague statute to imply the existence of broad, sweeping powers.

Constitutional scholar John Hart Ely believed that "strict constructionism" is not really a philosophy of law or a theory of interpretation, but a coded label for judicial decisions popular with a particular political party.

The term is frequently used even more loosely to describe any conservative judge or legal analyst. This usage is pervasive, but in tension with the legal meaning of the term. For example, on the campaign trail in 2000, when speaking on his choices for new Supreme Court Justices, George W. Bush promised to appoint "strict constructionists in the mold of Justices Rehnquist, Scalia, and Thomas", though Thomas considers himself an originalist, and Scalia outright rejected strict construction, calling it "a degraded form of textualism."

== History ==
The use of the term strict construction in American politics is not new. The term was used regularly by members of the Democratic-Republican Party and by Democrats during the antebellum period when they argued that powers of the federal government listed in Article I should be strictly construed. They embraced this approach in the hope that it would ensure that the bulk of governmental power would remain with the states and not be usurped by the federal government via novel interpretations of its powers. Perhaps the best known example of this approach is Jefferson's opinion arguing against the constitutionality of a national bank. Because the vagueness of Article I inevitably lent itself to broad interpretations as well as narrow ones, strict constructionists turned to the somewhat restrained descriptions of the powers of Congress that were offered by advocates of the Constitution during ratification. Thus, politicians who identified themselves as strict constructionists embraced an approach to constitutional interpretation that resembles what we today call originalism.

The term began to be used by conservative politicians such as beginning with Richard Nixon in 1968 when he was running for election. His pledge was to appoint justices that interpret the law and reinstate "law and order" to the judiciary. President Nixon appointed four justices that seemed (at the time) to be of that philosophy. One of them, Harry Blackmun, however, shifted leftward, while another, Lewis F. Powell, became a moderate. The other two, Warren Burger and William Rehnquist, were in the mold of what most think of in terms of strict constructionists. Gerald Ford, when running to serve a full term of his own, distanced himself from this issue. Ronald Reagan, however, also promised strict constructionists. All three of his US Supreme Court nominees loosely fell into this category. Still, Antonin Scalia was more of an originalist, while Sandra Day O'Connor and Anthony Kennedy were fairly conservative. Since Reagan, Republican presidents George W. Bush and Donald Trump, along with Republican nominee John McCain, have all promised to nominate strict constructionist judges to the courts.

== Criticism ==
The term has been criticized as being a misleading or meaningless term. Few judges self-identify as strict constructionists, due to the narrow meaning of the term. Antonin Scalia, the justice most identified with the term, once wrote: "I am not a strict constructionist, and no one ought to be," calling the philosophy "a degraded form of textualism that brings the whole philosophy into disrepute." Scalia summarized his textualist approach as follows: "A text should not be construed strictly, and it should not be construed leniently; it should be construed reasonably, to contain all that it fairly means." He continued with one real case to differentiate them:

The difference between textualism and strict constructionism can be seen in a statutory case my Court decided last term. The statute at issue provided for an increased jail term if, "during and in relation to ... [a] drug trafficking crime," the defendant "uses ... a firearm." The defendant in this case had sought to purchase a quantity of cocaine; and what he had offered to give in exchange for the cocaine was an unloaded firearm, which he showed to the drug-seller. The Court held, I regret to say, that the defendant was subject to the increased penalty, because he had "used a firearm during and in relation to a drug trafficking crime." The case was not even close (6–3). I dissented. Now I cannot say whether my colleagues in the majority voted the way they did because they are strict-construction textualists, or because they are not textualists at all. But a proper textualist, which is to say my kind of textualist, would surely have voted with me. The phrase "uses a gun" fairly connoted use of a gun for what guns are normally used for, that is, as a weapon. When you ask someone "Do you use a cane?" you are not inquiring whether he has hung his grandfather's antique cane as a decoration in the hallway.

=== Doctrine of absurdity ===
In law, strictly literal interpretations of statutes can lead one to logically deduce absurdities, and the doctrine of absurdity is that common sense interpretations should be used in such cases, rather than literal reading of a law or of original intent. The absurdity doctrine is a doctrine in legal theory, also known as "scrivener's error exception"; in which American courts have interpreted statutes contrary to their plain meaning in order to avoid absurd legal conclusions. It has been described as follows:

The common sense of man approves the judgment mentioned by Puffendorf [sic], that the Bolognian law which enacted "that whoever drew blood in the streets should be punished with the utmost severity", did not extend to the surgeon who opened the vein of a person that fell down in the street in a fit. The same common sense accepts the ruling, cited by Plowden, that the statute of [1st] Edward II, which enacts that a prisoner who breaks out of prison shall be guilty of a felony, does not extend to a prisoner who breaks out when the prison is on fire – "for he is not to be hanged because he would not stay to be burnt".

== See also ==
- Constitutionalism
- Judicial activism
- Judicial restraint
- Originalism
- Textualism
