= Living tree doctrine =

Canadian doctrine of constitutional interpretation

In Canadian law, the living tree doctrine (French: théorie de l'arbre vivant) is a doctrine of constitutional interpretation that says that a constitution is organic and must be read in a broad and progressive manner so as to adapt it to the changing times.

== Concept ==
The living tree doctrine has been deeply entrenched into Canadian constitutional law since the seminal constitutional case of Edwards v Canada (Attorney General), also widely known as the Persons Case, wherein Viscount Sankey stated in the 1929 decision: "The British North America Act planted in Canada a living tree capable of growth and expansion within its natural limits." This is known as the doctrine of progressive interpretation. This means that the Constitution cannot be interpreted in the same way as an ordinary statute. Rather, it must be read within the context of society to ensure that it adapts and reflects changes. If constitutional interpretation adheres only to the framers' intent and remains rooted in the past, the Constitution would not be reflective of society and would eventually fall into disuse.

The "frozen concepts" reasoning runs contrary to one of the most fundamental principles of Canadian constitutional interpretation: that our Constitution is a living tree which, by way of progressive interpretation, accommodates and addresses the realities of modern life.

Lord Sankey LC’s reference to "natural limits" did not impose an obligation to determine, in the abstract and absolutely, the core meaning of constitutional terms.

However, "natural limits" cannot be granted too elastic a definition. In the Marcotte trilogy, it was held that payments by credit card could not be considered to fall within the federal bills of exchange power, as there had been no shift in how a bill of exchange is defined in Canada.

== Charter ==
The interpretation of the Canadian Charter of Rights and Freedoms also makes use of the living tree doctrine. Chief Justice Antonio Lamer stated in Re B.C. Motor Vehicle Act, "If the newly planted 'living tree' which is the Charter is to have the possibility of growth and adjustment over time, care must be taken to ensure that historical materials, such as the Minutes of Proceedings and Evidence of the Special Joint Committee, do not stunt its growth."

== Outside Canada ==
=== United States ===
In the United States there is also a philosophy of a living constitution. The idea of the living constitution is similar to the living tree doctrine; both philosophies assert that the constitution of their respective countries should reflect the current mores and values of society. This view point is in contrast with constitutional originalism, which is the belief that the constitution of the United States is to be interpreted in a way that reflects the original meaning when it was written.

=== United Kingdom ===
In a 2011 speech, Brenda Hale, Baroness Hale of Richmond used the terminology of the living tree in a somewhat controversial discussion of the European Convention of Human Rights, describing it as a more "vivid image" than the "living instrument" doctrine used in relation to the Convention.

=== India ===
The Constitution of India is considered to be a living and breathing document.

== See also ==
- Living instrument doctrine, used by the European Court of Human Rights
- Constitutional history of Canada
- Original intent
