= Howard Lee McBain =

Howard Lee McBain (July 20, 1880 – May 7, 1936) was an American political scientist. He is best known for originating the phrase "Living Constitution," the subject of his 1927 book of the same name.

== Early life ==
McBain was the son of William McBain and Mary Catherine Warden. Born in Toronto, Ontario, Canada, on July 20, 1880, he lived in his mother's hometown of Richmond, Virginia, from 1882 to 1904. He entered Richmond College in 1896 and earned a Bachelor of Arts (AB) degree there in 1900 and a Master of Arts (MA) in 1901. While there he was elected a member of Phi Beta Kappa.

== Career ==
He was assistant principal of Richmond High School from 1901 to 1904, when he entered the University of Chicago. He was the President's Scholar in Constitutional Law at Columbia University from 1904 to 1906 and an Honorary Fellow in Constitutional Law from 1906 to 1907. He earned his Master of Arts (MA) degree there in 1905, writing his master's thesis on "Constitutional development in Virginia, 1776–1850" and a Doctor of Philosophy in 1907, writing his thesis on "De Witt Clinton and the origin of the spoils system in New York."

After spending a year as dean of the College of Political Sciences at George Washington University and three as an associate professor at the University of Wisconsin, MacBain returned to Columbia in 1913, as an associate professor of municipal science and administration. He became Eaton Professor in 1917 in succession to Frank Johnson Goodnow and, in 1929, became the Ruggles Professor of Constitutional Law. He was also the chairman of Columbia's Department of Political Science and Public Law. Columbia granted him an honorary Doctor of Laws (LLD) degree in 1927, as did Richmond College in 1932.

In addition to his work at Columbia, McBain was special counsel to the city of New York at the New York Constitution Convention in 1915, a member of the New York City Board of Education from 1916 to 1918, and the New York City Charter Commission from 1921 to 1923. He was special advisor to the government of Gerardo Machado in Cuba and helped draft new electoral laws there. He co-authored with Lindsay Rogers The New Constitutions of Europe, published in 1922 by Doubleday, Page, & Co.

In 1929, McBain succeeded George B. Pegram as Dean of Graduate Studies, but he suffered a sudden fatal heart attack on May 7, 1936.

== "Living Constitution" ==
McBain is best known for originating the phrase "Living Constitution," the subject of his 1927 book of the same name. He wrote, "However unchanging the form, it is the peculiar virtue of our bills of rights that their substance has changed and is changing."

He also wrote, "The Constitution of the United States was not handed down on Mount Sinai by the Lord God of Hosts. It is not revealed law. It is no final cause. It is human means."

== Works ==
- 1906 The Elements of English grammar : with suggestions for composition work (with Albert Le Roy Bartlett)
- 1907 Dewitt Clinton and the Origin of the Spoils System
- 1916 The Law and the Practice of Municipal Home Rule
- 1917 American City Progress and the Law
- 1922 Government and politics in Virginia
- 1922 The New Constitutions of Europe (with Lindsay Rogers)
- 1927 The Living Constitution
- 1928 Prohibition, Legal and Illegal
- 1934 On Immortality
