= Judicial populism =

How public opinion influences courts

Judicial populism or juridical populism is a phenomenon where the judgments and actions of the courts are driven by the perception of the masses or certain groups. The term, which some refer to as popular constitutionalism, has been described as a reaction to the perceived elitist bias in the legal system.

Judicial populism can also refer to the actions of the courts that reflect public sentiment or those aimed at garnering public support for the judicial institution.

== Background ==
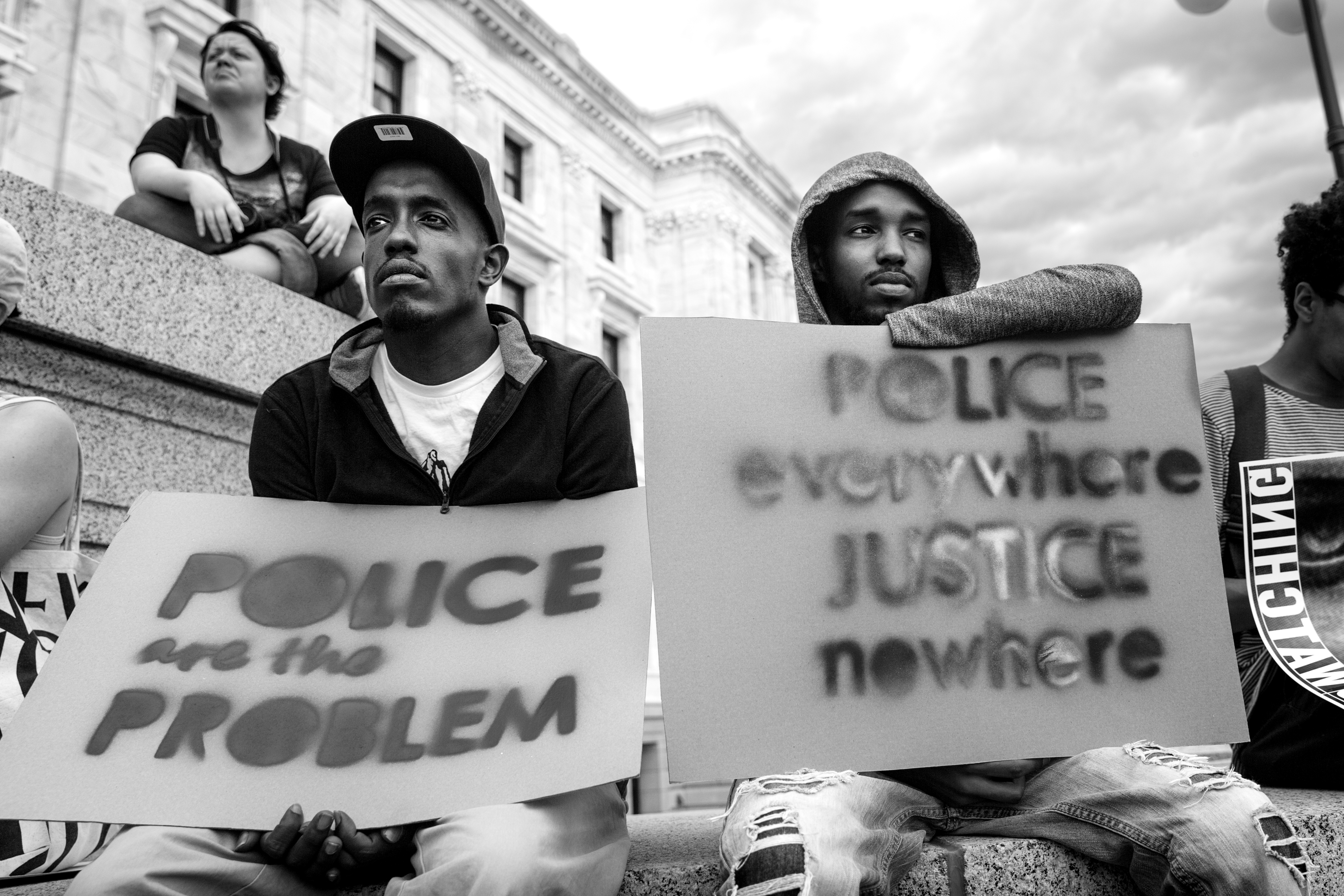
Demonstrators after the acquittal of Jeronimo Yanez, the police officer who killed Philando Castile in 2016.

Judicial populism addresses the argument that the judicial institution does not represent the interest of the public or a group of people.

Judicial populism is considered an aspect of populism, particularly the strand that claims to represent the interests of the people against a corrupt elite. Due to accusations of excessive privileges, inefficiencies, and possible political corruption, there is an increased hostility towards the judicial system and the creation of an atmosphere of distrust for the courts. Activism among populist groups calls for judicial decisions that reflect the collective will of the people within a particular subculture.

In response, there are court judgments that are made as a form of self-representation to appease the public, obtain support or legitimacy by reflecting public sentiment. This can be demonstrated in the so-called dialectic court proceedings, which no longer focus on the evaluation of evidence but their legitimacy. The position is that this type of populism can reduce the alienation or distance of the citizens to the judicial institution due to an expectation that decisions are more meaningful to their lives.

There are also theorists who maintain that judicial decisions are anti-democratic in character and view these decisions as judicial intervention. This position is prominent in the antagonism towards decisions involving social rights where the constitutional backgrounds of judges are considered inadequate due to issues of technical competence or a perceived judicial prejudice. It is also argued that judges are not elected to their positions and, for this reason, must not be allowed to decide on the social or economic path of a country.

In the United States, the call for judicial populism also emerges according to political ideologies. In the past, it came with the conservative assault to the so-called "judicial supremacy" as the courts outlawed segregation and created reproductive rights, among other issues. In the modern period, the call is often made by liberal critics who assail what is perceived as "right-wing rulings".

== Concept ==
As a theory, judicial populism holds that the law emanates from some kind of collective general will. It is founded on democratic and participatory theory wherein the people or at least their elected representatives get to decide policy, the state's developmental path, and the administration of justice. Larry Kramer, for instance, argued that the people do not only share in construing the Constitution but also render the final judgment concerning its meaning. The concept is also a basis of the Chinese legal tradition established during the Cultural Revolution-era and its modern revival. It draws from the cultural belief of the non-finality of justice as well as the revolutionary values such as democratic justice and deliberative justice, which rely on the collective judgment of the people.

Critics argue that instead of the courts serving as places that determine the liability for criminally relevant acts, the emergence of judicial populism crushes the criminal justice system as it transforms trials into methods of social control. The opposing concept to judicial populism is judicial professionalism. This view maintains that knowledge, rationality, and ethics should be the focus in legal practice. There is also a requirement for judges to be neutral and to avoid conflict of interest, a component that is present in judicial populism as the judge is involved in local affairs and forges a close relationship with the people.

=== Judicial populism vs judicial activism ===
Judicial populism is distinguished from judicial activism, which is described as a phenomenon wherein judges allow their personal views to guide their decisions. Like judicial populism, the latter - as described by Bradley Canon - draws from the constitutional dialogue/constitutional interdependence paradigm, which describes the judiciary as a participant to the constitutional interactions that involve other government branches. Here, instead of an omnipotent institution, the judiciary operates according to a framework based on interdependency and interaction while assuming the role of active protector of core social values. However, judicial activism is about the forced reading of the law by judges with the goal different from the intention of the legislative branch.

== Applications ==
An example of judicial populism is Mark Tushnet's suggestion of a populist American constitutional law that advances the so-called "thin Constitution", which would codify constitutionally protected and enforceable positive economic and social rights.

There is also the case of judicial elections, which has been identified as an instrument of popular constitutionalism. This framework emphasizes the importance of state judicial elections in the United States, particularly how the elected state justices can "stimulate and structure constitutional deliberations" on the national level.

Mass media has been cited for its role in dictating judicial agenda. It serves as a platform where the judicial institution is evaluated, facilitating new types of accountability regarding how justice is administered. For instance, it is claimed that media reporting has led to juristic activism that favor a populist expansion of fundamental rights and natural justice.

Cases of judicial populism include its emergence in Brazil since the mass protests of 2013. The series of political and economic crises that ensued have influenced the shift towards judicial decisions that involve judicial self-presentation before the public. It is also observed that judges at various points have made decisions sought by the masses or the middle class, promulgating decisions that have no legal arguments, no constitutional basis, and narrow constitutional protection in the name of justice.

== See also ==
- Law and order (politics)
- Judicial accountability
- Judicial reform
- Legal realism
- Living Constitution
- Mass incarceration
- Penal populism
