= Prudentialism =

Moral principle

Prudentialism is a moral principle based on precautionary principles that are acting to avoid a particular negative effect.

For example, acting in self-defence or, indeed, pre-emptive attacks on "rogue" states.

Prudentialism is also a philosophy of constitutional interpretation that considers laws and powers from a pragmatic viewpoint. According to government scholar John E. Finn, prudentialism "counsels judges to avoid setting broad rules for future cases and offers a particular understanding of the limited role courts should play in a constitutional democracy."
