= Autonomous concepts =

Autonomous concepts is a principle in the judicial interpretation of the European Convention on Human Rights and European Union law.
