= Randy Barnett =

American legal scholar (born 1952)

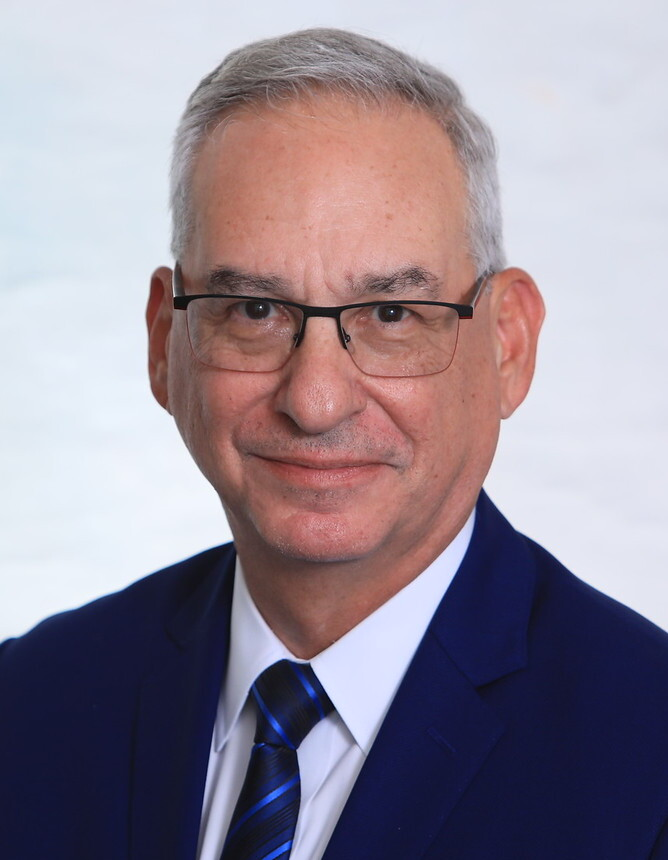
- Barnett in 2022
- Born: Randy Evan Barnett; February 5, 1952 (age 74); Chicago, Illinois, U.S.
- Education: Northwestern University (BA); Harvard University (JD)
- Title: Patrick Hotung Professor of Constitutional Law
- Awards: Guggenheim Fellowship (2008); Bradley Prize (2014)

Academic work
- Discipline: Constitutional law Contract law
- Institutions: Chicago-Kent College of Law; Boston University; Georgetown University; Cato Institute
- Website: www.randybarnett.com

Randy Evan Barnett (born February 5, 1952) is an American legal scholar. He is the Patrick Hotung Professor of Constitutional Law at Georgetown University, where he teaches constitutional law and contracts, and is the director of the Georgetown Center for the Constitution.

After graduating from Northwestern University and Harvard Law School, Barnett tried felony cases as a prosecutor in the Cook County State's Attorney's Office in Chicago. A recipient of a Guggenheim Fellowship in Constitutional Studies and the Bradley Prize, Barnett has been a visiting professor at Penn, Northwestern and Harvard Law School.

In 2004, Barnett argued the medical marijuana case of Gonzales v. Raich before the U.S. Supreme Court. In 2012, he was one of the lawyers representing the National Federation of Independent Business in its constitutional challenge to the Affordable Care Act in NFIB v. Sebelius. He blogs on The Volokh Conspiracy.

== Life and career ==
Barnett was born on February 5, 1952, in Chicago, Illinois, to a Jewish family. He was raised in Calumet City, Illinois, while attending synagogue in Hammond, Indiana, where he was president of the local Aleph Zadik Aleph (AZA) chapter and received his bar-mitzvah. After high school, Barnett was educated at Northwestern University, graduating in 1974 with a B.A. in philosophy. As an undergraduate, he was mentored by professor Henry Veatch in addition to being influenced by Murray Rothbard and the works of Ayn Rand.

After graduation, Barnett enrolled in Harvard Law School, receiving a J.D. in 1977. Barnett then returned to Chicago and worked as an Illinois state prosecutor for Cook County, Illinois.

Barnett spent the 1981–82 academic year as a research fellow at the University of Chicago Law School, then, in the fall of 1982, began his academic career as an assistant professor of law at the Chicago-Kent College of Law. In 1993, Barnett was hired as a professor of law at the Boston University School of Law. In 2006, Barnett left Boston and began teaching at the Georgetown University Law Center, where he currently remains.

== Jurisprudence ==
In The Structure of Liberty, Barnett offers a libertarian theory of law and politics. Barnett calls his theory "the liberal conception of justice" and emphasizes the relationship between legal libertarianism and classical liberalism. He argues private adjudication and enforcement of law, with market forces eliminating inefficiencies and inequities, to be the only legal system that can provide adequate solutions to the problems of interest, power, and knowledge.

He discusses theories of constitutional legitimacy and methods of constitutional interpretation in Restoring the Lost Constitution.

There have been several criticisms and reviews of his theory, including Stephan Kinsella, Richard Epstein, David N. Mayer, Lawrence B. Solum, and John K. Palchak and Stanley T. Leung.

== Supreme Court cases ==
Barnett was also lead lawyer for the plaintiffs in Ashcroft v. Raich (later Gonzales v. Raich), which he won before the Ninth Circuit, which ruled that federal action against legal marijuana patients violated the Commerce Clause. Barnett's side, however, lost on appeal at the Supreme Court, which ruled that Congress had the power to enforce federal marijuana prohibition in states that had legalized medical marijuana. He was also involved in the famous Affordable Care Act case National Federation of Independent Business v. Sebelius.

== Constitutional theory ==
Barnett has also done work on the theory of the United States Constitution, culminating in his books Restoring the Lost Constitution and Our Republican Constitution. He argues for an originalist theory of constitutional interpretation and for constitutional construction based on a presumption of liberty, not popular sovereignty.

Barnett also focuses on the history and original meaning of the Second and Ninth Amendments to the United States Constitution. He has advanced the Standard Model interpretation that the Second Amendment protects an individual's right to bear arms, subject to federal regulation under Congress's power to organize the militia in Article I, Section 8 of the Constitution.

=== Ninth Amendment ===
Barnett is a proponent of the view that the Ninth Amendment's rights "retained by the people" should be vigorously enforced by the federal judiciary. In a 2006 article, Barnett wrote:

The purpose of the Ninth Amendment was to ensure that all [enumerated and unenumerated] individual natural rights had the same stature and force after some of them were enumerated as they had before; and its existence argued against a latitudinarian interpretation of federal powers.

Regarding what stature and force natural rights had before some of them were enumerated, Barnett says that federal courts did not have authority to enforce such rights against the states. He wrote in the same 2006 article:

It was only with passage of the Fourteenth Amendment ... that the federal government obtained any jurisdiction to protect the unenumerated retained natural rights of the people from infringement by state governments.

A related issue is whether the original unamended Constitution gave federal courts authority to enforce unenumerated natural rights against congressional regulation of the federal district. Barnett has indicated that federal courts had such authority and that enumerated rights "had the same stature and force" in the district even before they were enumerated. He has indicated that the case of Bolling v. Sharpe (dealing with integration of public schools in the District of Columbia) is hard to justify textually from the Constitution, and if it were to be overturned, Congress would create more laws desegregating the district, which would be justified in his view of the Constitution.

The question of what constitutional rights citizens possessed in the federal district has ramifications for the meaning of the Privileges or Immunities Clause of the Fourteenth Amendment. In 2003, Barnett wrote:

Just as the Fourteenth Amendment extended protection of the enumerated rights of the first eight amendments to violations by state governments, so too did it extend federal protection of the pre-existing unenumerated rights "retained by the people."

If no such federal constitutional protection of unenumerated rights existed in the federal district prior to the Fourteenth Amendment, only enumerated rights may have been extended by it.

=== Fourteenth Amendment ===
With Evan Bernick, Barnett reviews the history and sources of the Fourteenth Amendment as well as what he considers its misunderstanding and legal misuse in the Belknap Press title The Original Meaning of the Fourteenth Amendment: Its Letter and Spirit. Barnett's reading of Lysander Spooner was instrumental in changing his constitutional theory.

In February 2025, Barnett co-authored an op-ed in the New York Times with Ilan Wurman where they argue that there is no right to birthright citizenship for the children of undocumented immigrants under the Fourteenth Amendment. They wrote the op-ed in defense of an executive order by President Donald Trump. Other legal scholars challenged the op-ed. Jed Shugerman wrote that Barnett and Wurman offered very thin evidence for their interpretation of the Fourteenth Amendment; he asserted no evidence from the period of ratification was cited. Indeed, the only two pieces of evidence to which they could point, he asserted actually contradicted their argument. Ilya Somin also criticized the lack of evidence, while adding that if Barnett and Wurman's interpretation was correct, it would undermine the central purpose of the Citizenship Clause.

=== Repeal Amendment ===
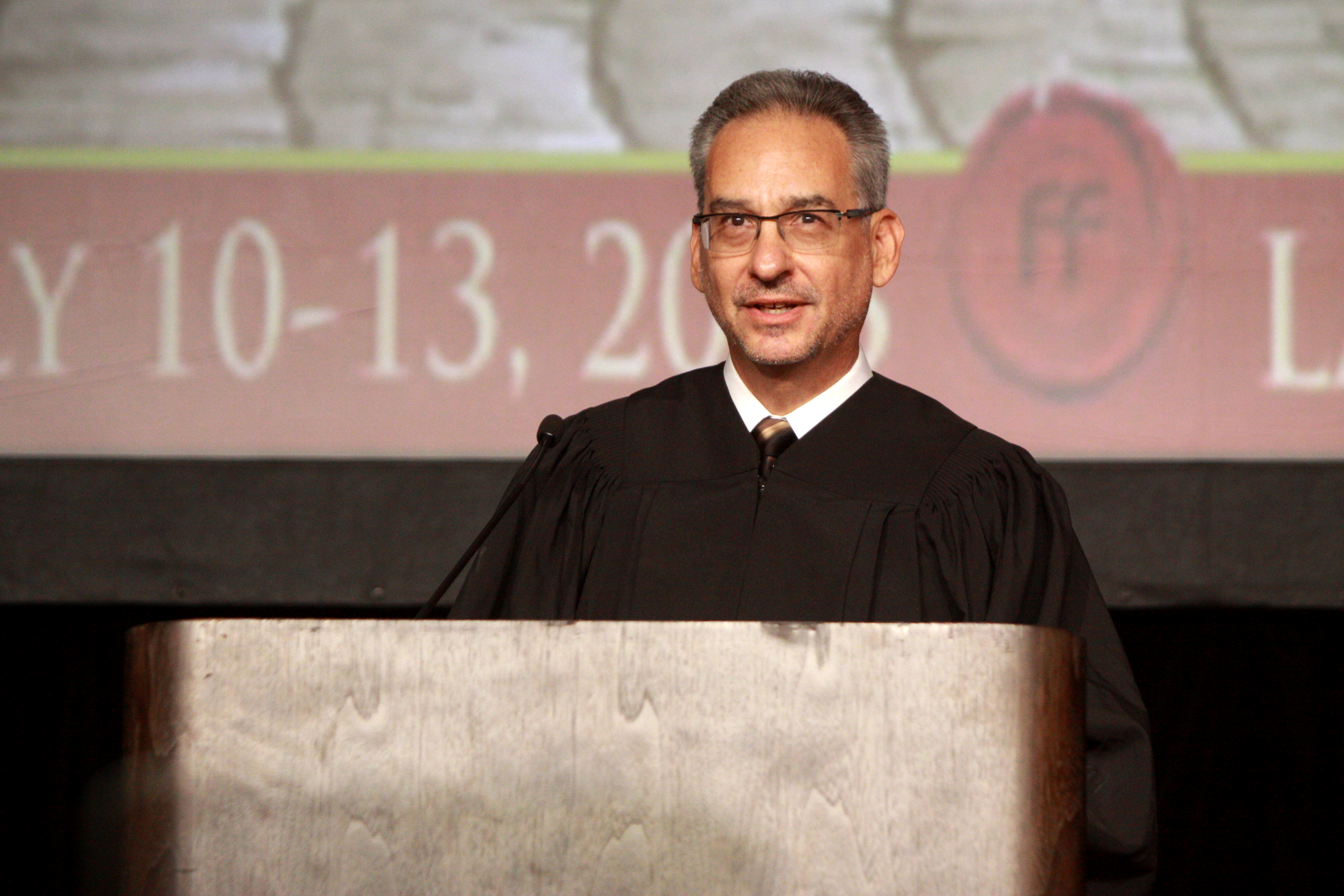
Barnett speaking at the 2013 FreedomFest in Las Vegas, Nevada

Barnett has proposed a Repeal Amendment to the United States Constitution, which would give two thirds of the states the power to repeal any federal law or regulation. According to Barnett, the proposed amendment "provides a targeted way to reverse particular congressional acts and administrative regulations without relying on federal judges or permanently amending the text of the Constitution to correct a specific abuse." He described the intent of the amendment as follows:

The Repeal Amendment alone will not cure all the current problems with federal power. Getting two-thirds of state legislatures to agree on overturning a federal law will not be easy and will only happen if a law is highly unpopular.

Perhaps its most important effect will be deterring even further expansions of federal power. Suppose, for example, that Congress decides to nationalize private pension investments. Just as it must now contemplate a presidential veto, so too would Congress need to anticipate how states will react.

The Repeal Amendment would help restore the ability of states to protect the powers 'reserved to the states' noted in the 10th Amendment. And it would provide citizens another political avenue to protect the 'rights ... retained by the people' to which the Ninth Amendment refers. In short, the amendment provides a new political check on the threat to American liberties posed by a runaway federal government. And checking abuses of power is what the written Constitution is all about."

Barnett's proposal has received interest from many politicians and academics, even those who do not share his libertarian beliefs. "[A] number of congressional Republicans, including soon-to-be House Majority Leader Eric Cantor" have endorsed the proposal, as has Attorney General of Virginia Ken Cuccinelli. Republican Congressman Rob Bishop of Utah introduced the amendment in the House of Representatives. University of Texas Law Professor Sanford Levinson has said that the Repeal Amendment "ha[s] the merit of recognizing that structures matter.".

=== Bill of Federalism ===
Bill of Federalism
- Created: May 13, 2009
- Author: Randy Barnett
- Purpose: "To restore a proper balance between the powers of Congress and those of the several States, and to prevent the denial or disparagement of the rights retained by the people"

The Bill of Federalism is a list of ten proposed amendments to the United States Constitution by Barnett. It would enshrine in the Constitution certain ideas based on states' rights and free market libertarianism. Barnett drafted the bill in response to the Tea Party movement's emphasis on limiting federal powers. The present draft of the document was published on May 13, 2009, and incorporated much of the feedback that Barnett had received in response to the previous draft. The document is an expansion of an earlier 'Federalist Amendment' that Barnett composed as part of an article he wrote in the Wall Street Journal.

Barnett advocates for the states to call for a Constitutional Convention in which they would propose the amendments comprising the bill. Alternatively, the United States Congress could propose the amendments to the states, as they have done every time a Convention to propose amendments has been called for.

The amendments, summarized by number below, would:

1. Disallow federal income taxes (repeal Sixteenth Amendment), as well as gift, estate, and consumption taxes; allow FairTax; require a three-fifths supermajority to raise or set new taxes
2. Set limits on the Interstate Commerce Clause
3. Disallow unfunded mandates and conditions on funding.
4. Close a constitutional loophole that allows treaties to override established limits on power
5. Extend free speech consideration to campaign contributions and to cover any medium of communication (including the Internet)
6. Allow a resolution of three fourths of the states to rescind any federal law or regulation.
7. Establish term limits for Senators and Representatives.
8. Provide the President with a line-item veto to balance the budget on any year in which it is unbalanced.
9. Reinforce the Ninth Amendment by specifying additional rights and by providing a process for any person to prove the existence of an unenumerated right.
10. Restrict judicial activism by mandating an originalist method of interpretation.

The Bill of Federalism Project has been incorporated as a nonprofit agency in the State of Tennessee.

== Personal life ==
Barnett is married to Beth Barnett. Their son, Gary Barnett, attended the Georgetown University Law Center and now works as a prosecuting attorney in Brooklyn, New York. Their daughter, Laura Barnett, lives in Washington, D.C., and works for the Institute for Humane Studies.

Following an armed attack on the 2026 White House Correspondents dinner by Cole Allen, Barnett posted on X: "If Barack Obama had a son, he'd attack the White House Correspondents Dinner like Cole Allen.", a mocking reference to a comment made by then-President Obama regarding the killing of Trayvon Martin in 2012.

== Bibliography ==
=== Books ===
- Barnett, Randy E. A Life for Liberty: The Making of an American Originalist. Encounter Books, 2024. ISBN 978-1641773775
- Barnett, Randy E., and Josh Blackman. An Introduction to Constitutional Law: 100 Supreme Court Cases Everyone Should Know. Wolters Kluwer, 2020. ISBN 978-1543813906
- Barnett, Randy E. Our Republican Constitution: Securing the Liberty and Sovereignty of We the People. Broadside Books, 2016. ISBN 978-0063475410
- Barnett, Randy E. Restoring the Lost Constitution: The Presumption of Liberty. Princeton University Press, 2003. ISBN 0691123764
  - Updated 2013. ISBN 978-0691159737
- Barnett, Randy E. The Structure of Liberty: Justice and the Rule of Law. Oxford University Press, 1998. ISBN 978-0198700920
- Barnett, Randy E. and Nathan B. Oman. Contracts: Cases and Doctrine. Aspen Publishing, 1995.
  - 8th edition, 2024. ISBN 979-8892074100
- Barnett, Randy E. and Nathan B. Oman. Perspectives on Contract Law. Little, Brown, 1995. ISBN 0316081299
  - 5th edition, Aspen Publishing, 2018. ISBN 978-1454848134

=== Articles ===
- "Justice Kennedy's Libertarian Revolution: Lawrence v. Texas" (Social Science Research Network 2003).
- Barnett, "Restitution: A New Paradigm of Criminal Justice" (Ethics 87, no. 4, July 1977).
- Barnett (2008). "Spooner, Lysander (1808–1887)". In Hamowy, Ronald (ed.). The Encyclopedia of Libertarianism. Thousand Oaks, CA: Sage; Cato Institute. pp. 488–490. doi:10.4135/9781412965811.n297. ISBN 978-1412965804. LCCN 2008009151. OCLC 750831024.

=== Movies ===
- InAlienable (2008) – Assistant to Crystal Barry (Marina Sirtis) (InAlienable IMDB entry)
