= Restoring the Lost Constitution =

Book by Randy Barnett

Restoring the Lost Constitution: The Presumption of Liberty
- 2004 cover
- Author: Randy Barnett
- Language: English
- Subject: U.S. Constitution
- Publisher: Princeton University Press
- Publication date: 2003
- Publication place: United States
- English publication date: 15 December 2003
- Media type: Print (Hardback & Paperback)
- Pages: 394 pp (first edition)
- ISBN: 978-1400825844
- OCLC: 52334894
- Dewey Decimal: 342.73/029 21
- LC Class: KF4541 .B313 2004

Restoring the Lost Constitution: The Presumption of Liberty is a 2003 book about the United States Constitution written by Randy Barnett, a professor of law at the Georgetown University Law Center. In the book, Barnett outlines his theory of constitutional legitimacy, interpretation, and construction. He argues that the Constitution should be interpreted by its "original meaning", distinct from the Founding Fathers' original intent.

Restoring the Lost Constitution was awarded the 2005 Lysander Spooner Award for Advancing the Literature of Liberty by Laissez Faire Books.

== Summary ==
Restoring the Lost Constitution is broken into four parts, each addressing an aspect of the U.S. Constitution.

1. Constitutional Legitimacy – describes the most common arguments for constitutional legitimacy, and argues against them in practical terms. Barnett suggests that in practice it is impossible for any constitution to derive its legitimacy from consent, but it must rather derive legitimacy through "necessity" and "propriety".
2. Constitutional Method
3. Constitutional Limits
4. Constitutional Powers

== Reception ==
The Journal of Libertarian Studies reviewed the book, stating that "though well-intentioned, the book is fatally flawed". The Future of Freedom Foundation praised Restoring the Lost Constitution, comparing it to "a great symphony on which the composer labored for years, poring over passages again and again to get them just right." The Atlas Society also reviewed the book, writing "Despite its occasional lack of focus, Restoring the Lost Constitution is a succinct and accurate distillation of libertarian constitutional theory—and it convincingly shows that this phrase is largely redundant." Steven G. Calabresi of the Michigan Law Review Association praised the work, citing that it "replaces Richard Epstein's Takings as the leading tome about constitutional law written from a libertarian perspective". The American Political Science Association reviewed the book, saying that it was "a welcome addition to a never-ending debate".

Ronald Kahn of the Law and Politics Book Review wrote that the book was "terrific in demonstrating the natural rights background to our Constitution and demonstrating that all rights cannot be listed in the Constitution", but that "Barnett's fundamental problem is that he allows for 'constitutional construction' when originalism cannot tell us which meanings to adopt, but he does not seem to allow for social construction of law, or changing social meanings". In Ethics Matthew Simpson criticized Restoring the Lost Constitution, stating that while Barnett "argues persuasively that an unprincipled judiciary poses a great threat to constitutionalism in America ... his own principle for reading the Constitution, the presumption of liberty, is implausible and deeply flawed".
