= Lindsay Rogers =

American scholar

Lindsay Rogers (May 23, 1891 – 1970) was an American scholar who was Burgess professor emeritus of public law at Columbia University.

== Early life and career ==
Rogers was born In Baltimore on 23 May 1891. He studied at Baltimore City College and Johns Hopkins University, where he completed a PhD in 1915.

In 1920, he joined the law faculty of Columbia University. He taught there until 1959 and held Burgess professor emeritus of public law chair.

As a writer, he wrote for The Times and The New York Times Sunday Magazine.

== Works ==
- The Postal Power of Congress: A Study in Constitutional Expansion (1916)
- America's Case Against Germany (1917)
- The American Senate (1926)
- Crisis Government (1934)
- The Pollsters: Public Opinion, Politics and Democratic Leadership (1949)
- An Introduction to the Problem of Government (1921)
- The New Constitutions of Europe (1922)
