= Robert J. Cottrol =

American legal scholar

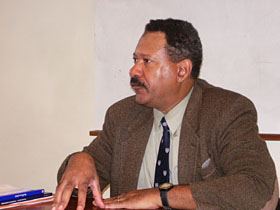
Robert J. Cottrol speaking to law students at the University of Montevideo, 2006.

Robert J. Cottrol (born January 18, 1949) is an American legal scholar and legal historian.

== Career ==
Cottrol holds a chair in the George Washington University (GWU) Law School and is also a professor of history and sociology at GWU. He earned his B.A. and Ph.D. from Yale University, and his J.D. from Georgetown Law School. His research concentrates on race relations in U.S. legal history and criminal law contexts. He is the author of five books and dozens of book chapters, law review articles, book reviews, and other published works on slavery, gun control, and others topics. He is also the editor of Gun Control and the Constitution: Sources and Explorations on the Second Amendment.

=== On gun control ===
Cottrol supports the use of background checks on firearms purchases, especially to prevent ownership by convicted felons. However, he argues that law-abiding citizens should have ready access to guns for self-defense. He says that minorities in particular need them to counter the threat of harsh treatment in racist cultures.

== Partial bibliography ==
- 1982 The Afro-Yankees: Providence's Black Community in the Antebellum Era
- 1993 Gun Control and the Constitution: Sources and Explorations on the Second Amendment (editor)
- 1998 From African to Yankee: Narratives of Slavery and Freedom in Antebellum New England
- 2003 Brown v. Board of Education: Caste, Culture, and the Constitution (with Raymond T. Diamond and Leland B. Ware)
- 2013 The Long, Lingering Shadow: Slavery, Race and Law in the American Hemisphere
