= Tyrer v. the United Kingdom =

Tyrer v. the United Kingdom (application No. 5856/72) was a case decided by the European Court of Human Rights in 1978.

== Facts ==
Anthony Tyrer, then aged 15, was given three strokes of the birch in 1972 in the Isle of Man, in accordance with a local juvenile court's sentence for unlawful assault occasioning actual bodily harm. The birching was carried out by policemen in private, in the presence of Tyrer's father and a doctor. Tyrer was made to take down his trousers and underpants and bend over a table.

== Judgment ==
By a majority of six votes to one, the court held Tyrer's birching to constitute degrading treatment contrary to the Article 3 of the European Convention on Human Rights. Significant conclusions of the case included that "the Convention is a living instrument which, as the Commission rightly stressed, must be interpreted in the light of present-day conditions. In the case now before it the Court cannot but be influenced by the developments and commonly accepted standards in the penal policy of the member States of the Council of Europe in this field".

Judge Gerald Fitzmaurice has dissented, finding no violation of Article 3 and concerning that the Court's conclusion "amounts to a finding that all corporal punishment, in all circumstances, inherently involves, as such, an unacceptable level of degradation." and that "assuming that corporal punishment does involve some degree of degradation, it has never been seen as doing so for a juvenile to anything approaching the same manner or extent as for an adult".

== Aftermath ==
The judgment was considered 'landmark' by Manfred Nowak, UN Special Rapporteur on torture and other cruel, inhuman or degrading treatment or punishment.
