= Original intent =

Legal doctrine

Original intent is a theory in law concerning constitutional and statutory interpretation. It is frequently used as a synonym for originalism; while original intent is one theory in the originalist family, it has some salient differences which has led originalists from more predominant schools of thought such as original meaning to distinguish original intent as much as legal realists do.

== Approach ==
Original intent maintains that in interpreting a text, a court should determine what the authors of the text were trying to achieve, and to give effect to what they intended the statute to accomplish, the actual text of the legislation notwithstanding. As in purposivism, tools such as legislative history are often used.

One example of original intent is in Freeman v. Quicken Loans Inc., [2012]. The plaintiffs took out mortgage loans from Quicken Loans. In 2008 they sued Quicken Loans arguing that that respondent had violated Real Estate Settlement Procedures Act (RESPA) Section 2607(b) by charging them fees for which no services were provided. The plaintiffs supported their allegation by referring to the Department of Housing and Urban Development (HUD) policy statement that says that §2607(b) “prohibit[s] any person from giving or accepting any unearned fees, i.e., charges or payments for real estate settlement services other than for goods or facilities provided or services performed.”

Justice Scalia delivered the opinion of the court that RESPA Section 2607(b) was not violated by referencing that RESPA included a directive that HUD make a report to Congress regarding the need for further legislation in the area, so the original intent was to pass new legislature if it was needed, so the Supreme Court ruled in favor of the defendant.

== Problems ==
=== Originalist criticisms of original intent proponents (and some proposed rebuttals) ===
Despite the potential confusion of terms between the original intent and originalism, other schools of originalist thought have been as critical of original intent as non-originalists.

- Original intent presumes that there is a single, unified intent behind a text. In the case of the United States Constitution, the Philadelphia Convention was composed of over fifty men, who spent an entire summer compromising and arguing over provisions that were interpreted very differently the moment the Constitution's text became public. It is far from clear, therefore, that those fifty-plus men had – i.e., agreed upon – a single original intent of the text, or whether their purposes in drafting the Constitution were predicated on personal self-interest. (There is no meaning from an originalist perspective without intent. That is, it is impossible to interpret anything which has no intent, according to originalism. Lawmakers either have no intent, one intent, or multiple intents. But these multiple intents are always consistent, otherwise the law can have no meaning.)
- Even if the convention did have a single, unified intent, it is unclear how it could reliably be determined from two centuries' distance. (That may be, but what can often be determined is that an interpretation being considered is inconsistent with the original intent even though the exact intent is not known.)
- Many of the clauses of the Constitution are relative, and thus specifically defy any claim that it is possible to divine a single, indisputable outcome to any specific problem or dispute. Key passages in the Constitution were originally cast as flexible evaluations, such as "due process", a phrase that suggests the definitions, requirements and dimensions of court or other governmental proceedings sufficient in any given context to permit citizens to be deprived of their rights were never intended to be fixed forever. (A single indisputable decision is never the outcome using any other jurisprudence. This is an argument against making any decision at all. The judge must merely make his best effort to decide in a manner which is consistent with the intent of the framers or authors of legislation, so far as they can ascertain it.)
- In the case of US federal law, law is made by majority vote in two chambers, and is then signed by the president. Five hundred and thirty-six people are therefore potentially involved in this process, and not one of them needs to share the same intentions as any other of them in order to play their part in ratifying the bill. They need only vote; their vote will count the same if they share the same intent as their colleagues, if they do not share the intent of their colleagues, and indeed, if they have no particular intention, and are voting solely because their party whip handed them a note saying "be on the Senate floor at 9:36 pm and say 'Aye'." Their vote will count even if they are falling-down drunk or if they have not even read the bill under consideration. All of which is to say that giving effect to the intent of the legislature not only presumes that there is a singular intent – no less dubious an assertion where statutes are concerned than where the Constitution is – but the very diversity of these bodies may permit a judge to corrupt their inquiry by finding a floor statement or committee report which suggests an intent that the judge thinks would be a good result. (The intent can be ascertained so far as the authors of the legislation or other less authoritative contemporary sources said what it was)
- Original intent may fall afoul of formalist theories of law, which explicitly decline interest in how a law is made, an inquiry which is obviously at the core of an original intent inquiry.
- Original intent cannot be reconciled against textualism. Most of those who are originalists in Constitutional matters are also textualists in statutory matters, and textualism rejects the value of the intentions of the legislature in passing a text. If one adopts originalism as an "error-correcting lens which fits over textualism to account for the passage of time", one cannot adopt an originalist theory which is incoherent with the underlying textualism.

== Other schools of thought ==
In Canada, the predominant school of thought for legal interpretation is the living tree doctrine, under which interpretations can evolve along with the society, to deal with new conditions that were different or did not exist when the Constitution was framed.

== See also ==
- Judicial activism
