= H. Jefferson Powell =

American law professor (born 1954)

- Born: Haywood Jefferson Powell; April 25, 1954 (age 72)
- Citizenship: American
- Education: St David's College; Yale Law School; Yale Divinity School; Duke University
- Occupation: Law professor
- Employer: Duke University
- Known for: Constitutional law; legal history

Haywood Jefferson Powell (born April 25, 1954) is an American lawyer, author, and law professor at Duke University.

== Education ==
A graduate of St. David's College (now the University of Wales, Lampeter) and of the Yale Law School and Yale Divinity Schools, Powell also has a Ph.D. in Christian theological ethics from Duke University and held a joint appointment in the Divinity School at Duke.

== Career ==
=== Government positions ===
Powell served in both the federal and state governments as a deputy assistant attorney general and as Principal Deputy Solicitor General in the U.S. Department of Justice under President Bill Clinton, and as special counsel to the Attorney General of North Carolina. He has briefed and argued cases in both federal and state courts, including Shaw v. Reno before the Supreme Court of the United States.

=== Law professor ===
Following a second tenure Justice Department, Powell served the Lyle T. Alverson Professor of Law at The George Washington University in Washington, D.C. from 2010 to 2012. Before joining The George Washington University Law Faculty, Powell had been a professor of law at Duke University since 1989. In 1999, the Duke Bar Association presented Powell with the Excellence in Small Section Teaching Award, and in the academic year 2001–2002, he was Duke University's Scholar/Teacher of the year. More recently, he has been named Frederic Cleaveland Professor of Law and Divinity. Powell is currently a professor of law at Duke University, where he teaches constitutional law and leads the school's First Amendment Clinic.

=== Published works ===
Powell has published several books in the fields of constitutional law and legal history executive power, and constitutional interpretation.

Year	Title	Publisher
1993	The Moral Tradition of American Constitutionalism: A Theological Interpretation	
1999	The Constitution and the Attorneys General	
2002	A Community Built on Words: The Constitution in History and Politics	University of Chicago Press
2008	Constitutional Conscience: The Moral Dimension of Judicial Decision	
2014	The President as Commander in Chief: An Essay in Constitutional Vision	
2016	Targeting Americans: The Constitutionality of the U.S. Drone War	Oxford University Press
2022	The Practice of American Constitutional Law	Cambridge University Press
