= Judicial restraint =

Judicial interpretation ideology advocating hesitance to set precedent

Judicial restraint is a judicial interpretation that recommends favoring the status quo in judicial activities and is the opposite of judicial activism. Aspects of judicial restraint include the principle of stare decisis (that new decisions should be consistent with previous decisions); a conservative approach to standing (locus standi) and a reluctance to grant certiorari; and a tendency to deliver narrowly tailored verdicts, avoiding "unnecessary resolution of broad questions."

Judicial restraint may lead a court to avoid hearing a case in the first place. The court may justify its decision by questioning whether the plaintiff has standing; by refusing to grant certiorari; by determining that the central issue of the case is a political question better decided by the executive or legislative branches of government; or by determining that the court has no jurisdiction in the matter.

Judicial restraint may lead a court to decide in favor of the status quo. In a case of judicial review, this may mean refusing to overturn an existing law unless the law is flagrantly unconstitutional (though what counts as "flagrantly unconstitutional" is itself a matter of some debate). On an appeal, restraint may mean refusing to overturn the lower court's ruling. In general, restraint may mean respecting the principle of stare decisis, which holds that new decisions should show "respect [...] for [the court's] own previous decisions."

Judicial restraint may lead a court to rule narrowly, avoiding "unnecessary resolution of broad questions" (an approach known as judicial minimalism). Restrained rulings are small and case-specific, rather than broad and sweeping. Restrained rulings hesitate to justify themselves in terms of previously unidentified rights or principles.

== Examples ==
U.S. Supreme Court Justice Lewis F. Powell Jr. wrote:

A constitutional case involving stare decisis was South Carolina v. Gathers. In Gathers the Court was urged to reconsider Booth v. Maryland.... [In an example of judicial restraint,] Justice White, who had dissented in the Booth case, declined to overrule it. He joined Justice Brennan's opinion for the Court in Gathers. The four dissenters in Gathers [displaying the opposite of judicial restraint] explicitly called for overruling Booth. Justice Scalia ... argued that a Justice must be free to vote to overrule decisions that he or she feels are not supported by the Constitution itself, as opposed to prior precedents.

Roe v. Wade (1973) is frequently cited as an example of judicial activism, but subsequent cases, such as Whole Woman's Health v. Hellerstedt (2016), have demonstrated judicial restraint by ruling in harmony with the precedent set by Roe or by delivering narrow rulings on specific questions that do not explicitly seek to overturn Roe in its entirety.

Vacco v. Quill is an example of judicial restraint, in part for upholding a New York state law criminalizing physician-assisted suicide if the patient is terminally ill, and in part for refusing to set any new precedent such as a constitutionally protected right to die for patients who are terminally ill.

Former Associate Justice Oliver Wendell Holmes Jr., considered to be one of the first major advocates of the philosophy of judicial restraint, described its importance in many of his books. One writer described Associate Justice Felix Frankfurter, a Democrat appointed by Franklin Roosevelt, as the "model of judicial restraint".

William Rehnquist, who served as chief justice from 1986 to 2005, has been acknowledged as an advocate of judicial restraint, despite his Court's having overturned some precedents from the more liberal Warren Court. (In 1989, Lewis F. Powell Jr. analyzed decisions overruled by two previous Courts: Powell found that the "activist" Warren Court had explicitly overruled prior decisions sixty-three times in sixteen years, whereas the Burger Court had overruled sixty-one decisions in seventeen years, a "fairly constant" rate.)

=== Ashwander rules ===
The United States Supreme Court employs a principle known as the Ashwander rules, established in Ashwander v. Tennessee Valley Authority (297 U.S. 288, 346-347 (1936)). These rules state that if a controversy can be resolved on grounds other than those requiring constitutional adjudication, the Court should avoid addressing the constitutional question. Articulated by Justice Louis D. Brandeis, these principles guide the Court in steering clear of constitutional rulings whenever possible.

Justice Brandeis, concurring in Ashwander v. TVA, summarized several jurisprudential rules for exercising judicial self-restraint and avoiding rulings on the constitutionality of congressional legislation:

The Court developed, for its own governance in the cases confessedly within its jurisdiction, a series of rules under which it has avoided passing upon a large part of all the constitutional questions pressed upon it for decision. They are:

1. The Court will not pass upon the constitutionality of legislation in a friendly, non-adversarial, proceeding, declining because to decide such questions "is legitimate only in the last resort, earnest and vital controversy between individuals. It never was the thought that, by means of a friendly suit, a party beaten in the legislature could transfer to the courts an inquiry as to the constitutionality of the legislative act."
2. The Court will not "anticipate a question of constitutional law in advance of the necessity of deciding it." "It is not the habit of the Court to decide questions of a constitutional nature unless absolutely necessary to a decision of the case."
3. The Court will not "formulate a rule of constitutional law broader than is required by the precise facts to which it is to be applied."
4. The Court will not pass upon a constitutional question properly presented by the record if there is also present some other ground upon which the case may be disposed of. This rule has found most varied application. Thus, if a case can be decided on either of two grounds, one involving a constitutional question, the other a question of statutory construction or general law, the Court will decide only the latter. Appeals from the highest court of a state challenging its decision of a question under the Federal Constitution are frequently dismissed because the judgment can be sustained on an independent state ground.
5. The Court will not pass upon the validity of a statute upon complaint of one who fails to show that he is injured by its operation. Among the many applications of this rule, none is more striking than the denial of the right to challenge to one who lacks a personal or property right. (While not mentioned in Ashwander, there are exceptions in the case of a First Amendment challenge, where the party may raise the effect of a law on other person's First Amendment rights, the so-called "chilling effect" doctrine.)
6. The Court will not pass upon the constitutionality of a statute at the instance of one who has availed himself of its benefits.
7. "When the validity of an act of the Congress is drawn in question, and even if a serious doubt of constitutionality is raised, it is a cardinal principle that this Court will first ascertain whether a construction management of the statute is fairly possible by which the question may be avoided."

== See also ==
- Judicial activism
- Judicial minimalism
- Political question
- Separation of powers
- Stare decisis
- Judicial Review
- Judiciary Act of 1789
- Procedures of the Supreme Court of the United States
- U.S. Constitution, Article III
- U.S. Constitution, Eleventh Amendment
