= Originalism =

Legal interpretation doctrine

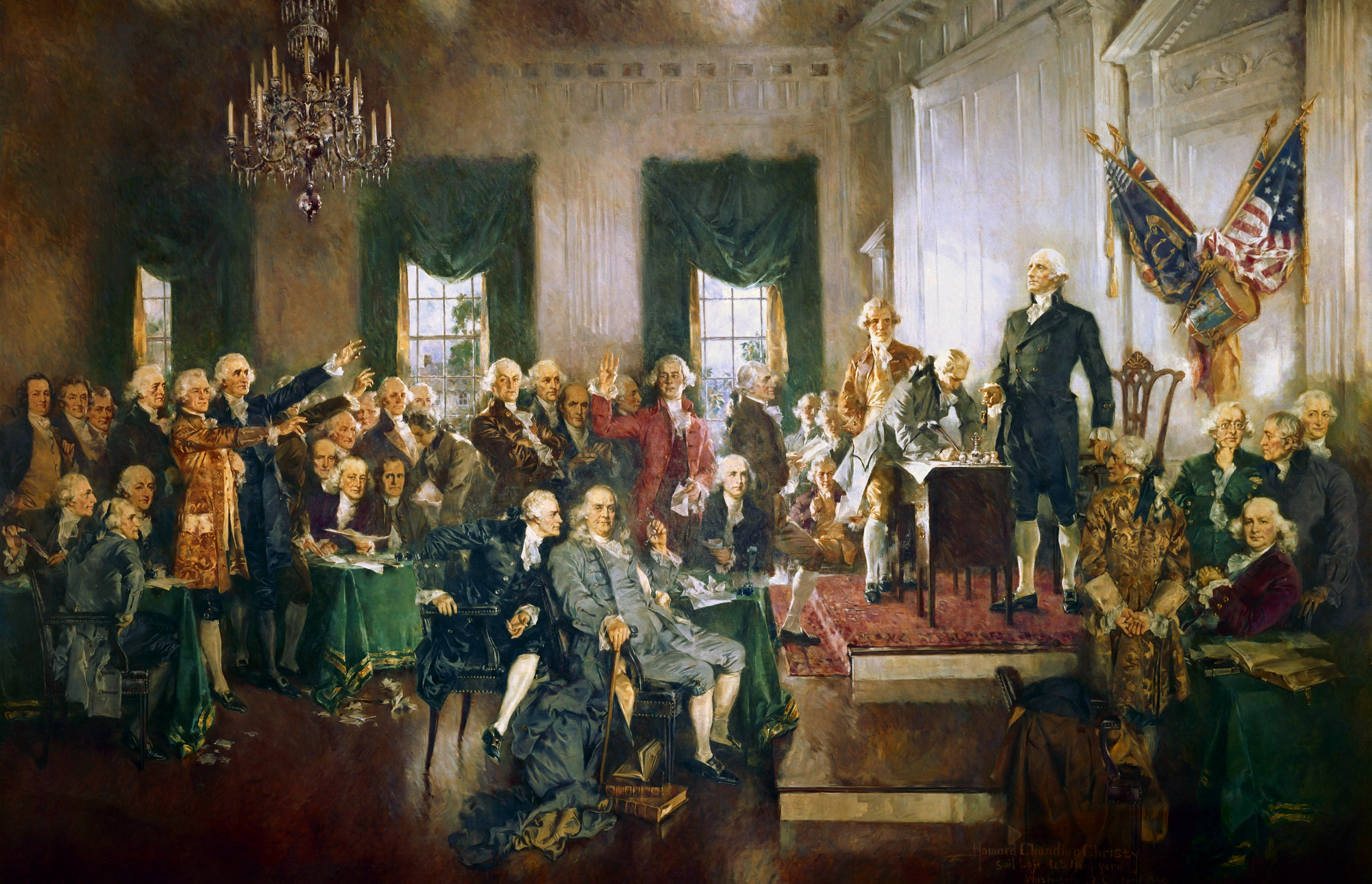
Scene at the Signing of the Constitution of the United States by Howard Chandler Christy

Originalism is a legal theory in the United States which bases constitutional, judicial, and statutory interpretation of text on the original understanding at the time of its adoption. Originalism consists of a family of different theories of constitutional interpretation and can refer to original intent or original meaning. Critics of originalism often turn to the competing concept of the Living Constitution, which asserts that a constitution should evolve and be interpreted based on the context of current times. Originalism should not be confused with strict constructionism or textualism.

Although some scholars argue that originalism has always been a part of American law, contemporary originalism emerged during the 1980s and greatly influenced American legal culture, practice, and academia, Over time, originalism became more popular and gained mainstream acceptance by 2020.

Originalism was advocated most prominently by Justice Antonin Scalia, whose opinion in District of Columbia v. Heller (2008) became a defining—and divisive—statement of originalist reasoning. Critics, including many professional historians, have argued that Heller relied on selective or flawed historical analysis. Despite such criticism, originalism has grown in prominence since Scalia's tenure, especially with the appointments of Justices Neil Gorsuch, Brett Kavanaugh, and Amy Coney Barrett during the Trump administration. The philosophy played a central role in major rulings such as Dobbs v. Jackson Women's Health Organization (2022), which overturned Roe v. Wade. In response, some scholars and jurists, including Justice Ketanji Brown Jackson, have advanced ideas of "progressive originalism." Meanwhile, critics contend that the Court's reliance on history has become inconsistent and politically driven, with Justice Sonia Sotomayor remarking that "history matters to this Court only when it is convenient."

== History ==
Proponents of originalism argue that originalism was the primary method of legal interpretation in America from the time of its founding until the time of the New Deal, when competing theories of interpretation grew in prominence.

=== Modern ===
Jurist Robert Bork is credited with proposing the first modern theory of originalism in his 1971 law review article, Neutral Principles and Some First Amendment Problems, published in The Yale Law Journal. He noted that without specification in a constitutional text, judges are free to input their own values while interpreting a constitution. Bork proposed one principled method to avoid this: for judges to "take from the document rather specific values that text or history show the framers actually to have intended and which are capable of being translated into principled rules." By following the original meaning, an originalist Supreme Court would therefore "need make no fundamental value choices," and its rulings would be restrained.

Law professor Raoul Berger expanded on the theory in Government by Judiciary (1977), positing that the rulings by the Warren and Burger Courts were illegitimate, as they deviated from the Constitution's original intent. In 1985, Edwin Meese, United States Attorney General under President Ronald Reagan, advanced a constitutional jurisprudence based on original intent in a speech before the American Bar Association, a jurisprudence that "would produce defensible principles of government that would not be tainted by ideological predilection." A few months after the speech, Justice William Brennan rejected Meese's view, claiming that the original intent of the Founding Fathers of the United States was indiscernible, and that text could only be understood in present terms. Later, in 1988 Ronald Reagan would advocate in favor of originalism during a speech at the Federalist Society for Law and Public Policy Studies.

During the 1980s, liberal members of the legal academy criticized the original intent formulated by Bork, Berger, and Meese. Serious opposition, beginning in law schools, evolved from debates in singular law review articles to books. In 1980, Paul Brest, who later became the dean of Stanford Law School, published "The Misconceived Quest for the Original Understanding," an article whose criticism of originalism proved formative and influential. Brest argued that a collective intent among the Founding Fathers of the United States was nonexistent and attempting to do so would be extremely difficult. He also posited that historical changes between the time of adoption to the present made originalism inapplicable in areas such as free speech, freedom of religion, federalism, and gender discrimination. Other scholars of the period adopted and expanded Brest's critiques, including H. Jefferson Powell and Ronald Dworkin. Brest and Powell suggested versions of originalism that sought higher purposes than a specific framer's intent, leading to a shift in the dominant form of originalism from original intent to the original public understanding.

The debate grew more heated with the failed Supreme Court nomination of Robert Bork in 1986, with originalism in the 1990s becoming broadly endorsed in the conservative legal movement. In the 1980s, during the Reagan administration, the Department of Justice played an important role in lending legitimacy, in some eyes, to originalism.

== Types ==
=== Original intent ===
The historical arguments made by Hugo Black in Everson v. Board of Education relied entirely on historical evidence of the views of Madison and Jefferson and the appropriateness of interpreting the Establishment Clause based on that evidence. Edwin Meese once remarked that Black's record was evidence that "jurisprudence of original intention is not some recent conservative ideological creation".

=== Original public understanding ===
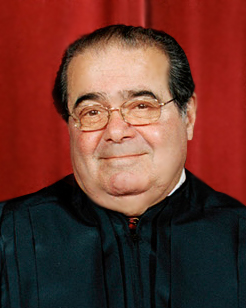
Supreme Court Justice Antonin Scalia (pictured) was a firm believer in originalism.

Original public understanding originalism bases the meaning of a constitutional provision on how the public which ratified it would have generally understood it to mean. Antonin Scalia was one of its most prominent theorists.

The conservative originalist movement spearheaded by Raoul Berger in the 1980s was a call for judicial restraint but over the years important differences have developed among originalist scholars. Justice Amy Coney Barrett explains:

A faithful judge resists the temptation to conflate the meaning of the Constitution with the judge's own political preference; judges who give into that temptation exceed the limits of their power by holding a statute unconstitutional when it is not. That was the heart of the originalist critique of the Warren and Burger Courts. At the same time, fidelity will inevitably require a court to hold some statutes unconstitutional.

Barrett, who has been described as a protégé of Scalia's, said at her confirmation hearing that she interprets the Constitution "as text, and I understand it to have the meaning that it had at the time people ratified it."

=== Original law ===
Drawing on the insights of H. L. A. Hart's legal positivism, original law originalism locates the authority of the Constitution in the social facts of the American legal system. Championed by legal scholars Stephen Sachs and William Baude, this theory posits that the "original law" of the Constitution—the legal rules and standards in force at the time of its enactment—remains binding today unless lawfully changed (e.g., by amendment). Unlike original public meaning originalism, which focuses on the communicative content or "linguistic meaning" of the text to an ordinary citizen, original law originalism focuses on the "legal meaning" or the specific legal rules the text invoked for lawyers and judges at the time (which may or may not include its original public meaning).

== Criticism ==
The originalism debate has divided the American public since the school desegregation decision in Brown v. Board of Education. Even before Brown, Catholic activists used originalist ideas in Everson v. Board of Education to try to protect funding for Catholic parochial schools.

According to Calvin Terbeek, originalism's appeal in modern times is rooted in conservative political resistance to the Brown v. Board of Education Supreme Court decision and opposition to some civil rights legislation. Segregationist Sam Ervin was an early proponent of originalism as he used the theory to argue in opposition to civil rights legislation during the 1960s.

Justices Antonin Scalia, Amy Coney Barrett, Clarence Thomas and Neil Gorsuch describe themselves as originalists in scholarly writings and public speeches.

=== Critics ===
Supreme Court Justice Elena Kagan, a frequent critic of conservative originalism, argues that some aspects of the Constitution were intentionally broad and vague to allow for future generations to interpret them as appropriate for the times. Supreme Court Justice William J. Brennan Jr. described originalism as "arrogance cloaked as humility" during a 1985 speech at Georgetown University. In this speech, he also stated "It is arrogant to pretend that from our vantage we can gauge accurately the intent of the framers", and that politicians that claim to do so are motivated purely by political reasons, as they "have no familiarity with the historical record."

Michael Waldman argues that originalism is a new concept and not one espoused by the Founders. According to a 2021 paper in the Columbia Law Review, the Founding Fathers did not include a nondelegation doctrine in the Constitution and saw nothing wrong with delegations as a matter of legal theory, contrary to the claims of some originalists.

Columbia Law School legal scholar Jamal Greene argues that originalism is remarkably unpopular outside the United States (including Canada, South Africa, India, Israel, and most of Europe), where judicial minimalism or textualism are the typical responses to judicial activism. Harvard Law School legal scholar Richard H. Fallon Jr. argues that the Supreme Court justices who claim to be originalists actually apply originalism in a highly selective manner "which typically abets substantively conservative decisionmaking."

Lawyer Madiba K. Dennie, the author of the book The Originalism Trap, is opposed to originalism, arguing "Despite originalism's reputation as a serious intellectual theory, it's more like dream logic: It seems reasonable at first, but when you wake up, you can recognize it as nonsense[...]Originalism deliberately overemphasizes a particular version of history that treats the civil rights gains won over time as categorically suspect. The consequences of its embrace have been intentionally catastrophic for practically anyone who isn't a wealthy white man, aka the class of people with exclusive possession of political power at the time the Constitution's drafters originally put pen to paper (or quill to parchment).'"

== Related positions ==
=== International law and originalism ===
Antonin Scalia, one of the best known conservative originalists, rejected any consideration of International law for interpreting the U.S. Constitution: "We must never forget that it is a Constitution for the United States of America that we are expounding. . . . Where there is not first a settled consensus among our own people, the views of other nations, however enlightened the Justices of this Court may think them to be, cannot be imposed upon Americans through the Constitution."

=== Strict constructionism ===
Scalia averred that he was "not a strict constructionist, and no-one ought to be"; he goes further, calling strict constructionism "a degraded form of textualism that brings the whole philosophy into disrepute".

Legal scholar Randy Barnett asserts that originalism is a theory of interpretation and that constructionism is only appropriate when deriving the original intent proves difficult.

=== Declarationism ===
Declarationism is a legal philosophy that incorporates the United States Declaration of Independence into the body of case law on level with the United States Constitution. It holds that the Declaration is a natural law document and so that natural law has a place within American jurisprudence. During the 1860s, Senator Charles Sumner heralded declarationism as justifying all human rights legislation without the need for the ultimately ratified Reconstruction Amendments. Harry V. Jaffa and Clarence Thomas have been cited as proponents of this school of thought.

== See also ==
- Living Constitution
- Unconstitutional constitutional amendment
