= Judicial activism =

Controversial judicial practice

Judicial activism is a judicial philosophy holding that courts can and should go beyond the applicable law to consider broader societal implications of their decisions. It is sometimes used as an antonym of judicial restraint. The term usually implies that a judge makes rulings based on their own views rather than on precedent. The definition of judicial activism, and which specific decisions are considered activist, are controversial political issues. The question of judicial activism is closely related to judicial interpretation, statutory interpretation, and separation of powers.

== Etymology ==
Arthur Schlesinger Jr. introduced the term "judicial activism" in a January 1947 Fortune magazine article titled "The Supreme Court: 1947".

The phrase has been controversial since its beginning. An article by Craig Green, "An Intellectual History of Judicial Activism," is critical of Schlesinger's use of the term; "Schlesinger's original introduction of judicial activism was doubly blurred: not only did he fail to explain what counts as activism, he also declined to say whether activism is good or bad."

Even before this phrase was first used, the general concept already existed. For example, Thomas Jefferson dubbed the judiciary a "despotic branch" when it was composed mostly of Federalist federal judges, notably referring to Chief Justice John Marshall.

== Definitions ==
Black's Law Dictionary defines judicial activism as a "philosophy of judicial decision-making whereby judges allow their personal views about public policy, among other factors, to guide their decisions."

Political science professor Bradley Canon has posited six dimensions along which judges or courts may be perceived as activist: majoritarianism, interpretive stability, interpretive fidelity, substance/democratic process, specificity of policy, and availability of an alternate policymaker.

David A. Strauss has argued that judicial activism can be narrowly defined as one or more of three possible actions: overturning laws as unconstitutional, overturning judicial precedent, and ruling against a preferred interpretation of the constitution.

Others have been less confident of the term's meaning, finding it instead to be little more than a rhetorical shorthand. Kermit Roosevelt III has argued that "in practice 'activist' turns out to be little more than a rhetorically charged shorthand for decisions the speaker disagrees with". Roosevelt defines judicial activism as "an approach to the exercise of judicial review, or a description of a particular judicial decision, in which a judge is generally considered more willing to decide constitutional issues and to invalidate legislative or executive actions."; likewise, the solicitor general under George W. Bush, Theodore Olson, said in an interview on Fox News Sunday, with regard to a case for same-sex marriage he had successfully litigated, that "most people use the term 'judicial activism' to explain decisions that they don't like." Supreme Court Justice Anthony Kennedy said that, "An activist court is a court that makes a decision you don't like."

== Indeterminacy debate in legal theory ==
Defenders of judicial activism say that in many cases it is a legitimate form of judicial review and that the interpretation of the law must change with changing times. Sunset provisions can limit the interpretation uncertainties in the law.

According to law professor Brian Z. Tamanaha, "Throughout the so-called formalist age, it turns out, many prominent judges and jurists acknowledged that there were gaps and uncertainties in the law and that judges must sometimes make choices." Under this view, any judge's use of judicial discretion will necessarily be shaped by that judge's personal and professional experience and his or her views on a wide range of matters, from legal and juridical philosophy to morals and ethics. This implies a tension between granting flexibility (to enable the dispensing of justice) and placing bounds on that flexibility (to hold judges to ruling from legal grounds rather than extralegal ones).

Critical legal studies argues that political argument and legal argument cannot be entirely separated.

== Judicial independence ==
Some proponents of a stronger judiciary argue that the judiciary helps provide checks and balances and should grant itself an expanded role to counterbalance the effects of transient majoritarianism, i.e., there should be an increase in the powers of a branch of government that is not directly subject to the electorate, so that the majority cannot dominate or oppress any particular minority through its elective powers. Other scholars have proposed that judicial activism is most appropriate when it restrains the tendency of democratic majorities to act out of passion and prejudice rather than after reasoned deliberation.

Richard H. Fallon Jr. quotes Justice Holmes "great cases... make bad law." in their explanation on presidential overreach. "Presidents frequently interpret their own powers without judicial review and where executive precedents play a large role in subsequent interpretive debates, some of the historical assertions of presidential authority that stretch constitutional and statutory language the furthest seem hard to condemn in light of the practical stakes."

== Judicial accountability ==
Detractors of judicial activism charge that it usurps the power of the elected branches of government and of legislatively created agencies, damaging the rule of law and democracy. One opponent of judicial activism wrote, "The courts have gradually abandoned their proper role of policing the structural limits on government and neutrally interpreting the laws and constitutional provisions without personal bias." Advocates of minimalist definitions of democracy focus on electoral accountability as source of political legitimacy, while maximalist definitions of democracy, include additional values typically enshrined in the constitutions. Parliamentary sovereignty views legislative bodies as supreme over judiciary. Constitutionalism views the constitution as supreme.

== By country ==
=== United States ===
The following rulings have been characterized as judicial activism.

- Dred Scott v. Sandford - 1857 decision ruling that African Americans could not claim citizen rights even if they had resided in free states.
- Brown v. Board of Education – 1954 Supreme Court ruling ordering the desegregation of public schools.
- Roe v. Wade – 1973 Supreme Court ruling creating the constitutional right to an abortion.
- Harlow v. Fitzgerald – A 1982 decision that significantly expanded the scope of the controversial qualified immunity doctrine.
- Bush v. Gore – The United States Supreme Court case between the major-party candidates in the 2000 presidential election, George W. Bush and Al Gore. The justices voted 5–4 to halt the recount of ballots in Florida and as a result Bush was chosen as president.
- Citizens United v. Federal Election Commission – 2010 Supreme Court decision declaring congressionally enacted limitations on corporate political spending and transparency as unconstitutional restrictions on free speech.
- Obergefell v. Hodges – 2015 Supreme Court decision declaring same-sex marriage as a right guaranteed under the Due Process Clause and the Fourteenth Amendment.
- Janus v. AFSCME – a 2018 Supreme Court decision addressing whether unions can require dues from all workers who benefit from collective bargaining agreements. The decision overturned the 41-year-old precedent of Abood v. Detroit Board of Education.
- Department of Homeland Security v. Regents of the University of California – a 2020 Supreme Court decision addressing whether the Department of Homeland Security under President Donald Trump had the authority to dismantle the Deferred Action for Childhood Arrivals program initiated by Executive Order under former President Barack Obama.
- Dobbs v. Jackson Women's Health Organization – a 2022 Supreme Court ruling reversing the effects of Roe v. Wade, allowing states once again to forbid abortion within their borders.
- Trump v. United States – a 2024 Supreme Court case holding a President of the United States has immunity from criminal prosecution for "official acts" after Donald Trump and others engaged in election interference during the 2020 election, including events during the January 6, 2021, attack on the U.S. Capitol.

Some US Presidents have also commented on the idea. When President George W. Bush announced his first nominations for the federal bench, he declared:

Every judge I appoint will be a person who clearly understands the role of a judge is to interpret the law, not to legislate from the bench. To paraphrase 4th president of the United States James Madison Jr (hailed as the Father of the Constitution for his role in drafting the Constitution of the United States and the Bill of Rights) the courts exist to exercise not the will of men, but the judgment of law. My judicial nominees will know the difference.

=== Canada ===
Judges in Canada are given the power to interpret law passed down from the legislature, discretionary power to resolve disputes, and the power to use common law and accepted judicial policy to render judgement. By the principle of separation of powers, a strong tradition in Canada and accepted practice, judges should respect the role of the legislature to create law. Judges are also charged to impartially apply the law as it is written.

Canada has a legal system that is derived from the British system of common law (and the French system in the province of Quebec). Canadian Courts have a structure that relies more heavily on the discretion of its judges, policy and common law to create a workable body of law. Thus Canada's legal system may have more potential for conflicts with regards to the accusation of judicial activism, as compared to the United States.

Former Chief Justice of the Supreme Court of Canada Beverley McLachlin has stated that:

the charge of judicial activism may be understood as saying that judges are pursuing a particular political agenda, that they are allowing their political views to determine the outcome of cases before them. ... It is a serious matter to suggest that any branch of government is deliberately acting in a manner that is inconsistent with its constitutional role.Supreme Court of Canada - Remarks of the Right Honourable Beverley McLachlin, P.C.

=== European Union ===
In the Cassis de Dijon Case, the European Court of Justice ruled the German laws prohibiting sales of liquors with alcohol percentages between 15% and 25% conflicted with EU laws. This ruling confirmed that EU law has primacy over member-state law. When the treaties are unclear, they leave room for the Court to interpret them in different ways. When EU treaties are negotiated, it is difficult to get all governments to agree on a clear set of laws. In order to get a compromise, governments agree to leave a decision on an issue to the Court.

The Court can only practice judicial activism to the extent the EU Governments leave room for interpretation in the treaties.

The Court makes important rulings that set the agenda for further EU integration, but it cannot happen without the consensual support of the member-states.

In the Irish referendum on the Lisbon Treaty many issues not directly related to the treaty, such as abortion were included in the debate because of worries that the Lisbon Treaty will enable the European Court of Justice to make activist rulings in these areas. After the rejection of the Lisbon Treaty in Ireland, the Irish Government received concessions from the rest of the member states of the European Union to make written guarantees that the EU will under no circumstances interfere with Irish abortion, taxation or military neutrality. Ireland voted on the Lisbon Treaty a second time in 2009, with a 67.1% majority voting Yes to the treaty.

=== India ===
India has a recent history of judicial activism, originating after the Emergency in India which saw attempts by the Government to control the judiciary. Public Interest Litigation was thus an instrument devised by the courts to reach out directly to the public, and take cognizance though the litigant may not be the victim. "Suo motu" cognizance allows the courts to take up such cases on its own. The trend has been supported as well as criticized. New York Times writer Gardiner Harris sums this up as

India's judges have sweeping powers and a long history of judicial activism that would be all but unimaginable in the United States. In recent years, judges required Delhi's auto-rickshaws to convert to natural gas to help cut down on pollution, closed much of the country's iron-ore-mining industry to cut down on corruption and ruled that politicians facing criminal charges could not seek re-election. Indeed, India's Supreme Court and Parliament have openly battled for decades, with Parliament passing multiple constitutional amendments to respond to various Supreme Court rulings.

All such rulings carry the force of Article 39A of the Constitution of India, although before and during the Emergency the judiciary desisted from "wide and elastic" interpretations, termed Austinian, because Directive Principles of State Policy are non-justiciable. This despite the constitutional provisions for judicial review and B R Ambedkar arguing in the Constituent Assembly Debates that "judicial review, particularly writ jurisdiction, could provide quick relief against abridgment of Fundamental Rights and ought to be at the heart of the Constitution."

Fundamental Rights as enshrined in the Constitution have been subjected to wide review, and have now been said to encompass a right to privacy, right to livelihood and right to education, among others. The 'basic structure' of the Constitution has been mandated by the Supreme Court not to be alterable, notwithstanding the powers of the Legislature under Article 368. This doctrine has been recognized by several countries like Bangladesh, Pakistan and Malaysia as part of their jurisprudence. Other countries such as Singapore, Belize and Uganda has heard important cases regarding the use of this doctrine in their own countries. The modern trend of judicial activism began in 1973 when the Allahabad High Court rejected the candidature of Indira Gandhi in State of Uttar Pradesh v. Raj Narain. The introduction of public interest litigation by Justice V. R. Krishna Iyer further expanded its scope. Recent examples quoted include the order to Delhi Government to convert the Auto rickshaw to CNG, a move believed to have reduced Delhi's erstwhile acute smog problem (it is now argued to be back) and contrasted with that of Beijing.

=== Israel ===
The Israeli approach to judicial activism has transformed significantly in the three decades since the 1992 Constitutional Revolution led by Aharon Barak, and, as of 2022, presents an especially broad version of robust judicial review and intervention. Additionally, taking into consideration the intensity of public life in Israel and the challenges that the country faces (including security threats), the case law of the Israeli Supreme Court touches on diverse and controversial public matters.

=== United Kingdom ===
One of the first cases was the Conway v Rimmer (1968); a Public-interest immunity, previously known as Crown privilege. Previously, a claim like this would be defined as definitive, but the judges had slowly begun to adopt more of an activist line approach. This had become more prominent in which government actions were overturned by the courts, as shown in the Miller case in 2016. The perceptions of judicial activism derived from the number of applications for judicial review made to the courts, which led to R (Miller) v The Prime Minister and Cherry v Advocate General for Scotland in 2019, joint landmark constitutional law cases on the limits of the power of royal prerogative to prorogue the Parliament of the United Kingdom. This can be seen throughout the 1980s, where there were about 500 applications within a year. This number dramatically increased as by 2013, there were 15,594 applications. This trend has attracted media attention. For instance, in 1993, William Rees-Mogg had challenged the Conservative government to ratify the Maastricht Treaty. Ultimately, judicial activism is greatly established throughout the UK as the courts are becoming more prone to scrutinise at their own will.

Obviously since the United Kingdom's judiciary powers do not come from electoral methods, they differ in strengths, weaknesses, opportunities, and threats compared to a free and democratic system. Baroness Hale of Richmond raises the popular concern that this system operates on a fundamentally different playbook to the United States of America's court of law, and personal bias can be inherited, through an 'old boys' club'.

Among critics of judicial activism in the United Kingdom are Richard Ekins, John Finnis, and Sir Stephen Laws. Policy Exchange's Judicial Power Project, headed by Ekins, is dedicated to opposing judicial activism by British judges.

== See also ==
- Certiorari
- Constitutional economics
- Government by Judiciary
- Impact litigation
- Judicial populism
- Kritarchy
- Letter and spirit of the law
- List of landmark court decisions in the United States
- Living Constitution
- Long march through the institutions
- Originalism
- Philosophy of law
- Rule according to higher law
- Unconstitutional constitutional amendment
- Political question
- Supreme Court Reform in the United States
