= Judicial interpretation =

Ways courts interpret laws, especially Constitutional laws

Judicial interpretation is the way in which the judiciary construes the law, particularly constitutional documents, legislation and frequently used vocabulary. This is an important issue in some common law jurisdictions such as the United States, Australia and Canada, because the supreme courts of those nations can overturn laws made by their legislatures via a process called judicial review.

For example, the United States Supreme Court has decided such topics as the legality of slavery as in the Dred Scott decision, and desegregation as in the Brown v Board of Education decision, and abortion rights as in the Roe v Wade decision. As a result, how justices interpret the constitution, and the ways in which they approach this task has a political aspect. Terms describing types of judicial interpretation can be ambiguous; for example, the term judicial conservatism can vary in meaning depending on what is trying to be "conserved". One can look at judicial interpretation along a continuum from judicial restraint to judicial activism, with different viewpoints along the continuum.

Phrases which are regularly used, for example in standard contract documents, may attract judicial interpretation applicable within a particular jurisdiction whenever the same words are used in the same context.

== Basis for judicial interpretation ==
In the United States, there are different methods to perform judicial interpretation:

- Balancing happens when judges weigh one set of interests or rights against an opposing set, typically used to make rulings in First Amendment cases. For example, cases involving freedom of speech sometimes require justices to make a distinction between legally permissible speech and speech that can be restricted or banned for, say, reasons of safety, and the task then is for justices to balance these conflicting claims. The balancing approach was criticized by Supreme Court justice Felix Frankfurter who argued that the Constitution gives no guidance about how to weigh or measure divergent interests.
- Doctrinalism considers how various parts of the Constitution have been "shaped by the Court's own jurisprudence", according to Finn.
- Founders' Intent involves judges trying to gauge the intentions of the authors of a statute or constitution. Problems can arise when judges try to determine which particular Founders or Framers to consult, as well as trying to determine what they meant based on often sparse and incomplete documentation.
- Originalism involves judges trying to apply the "original" meanings of different constitutional provisions. To determine the original meaning, a constitutional provision is interpreted in its original context, i.e. the historical, literary, and political context of the framers. From that interpretation, the underlying principle is derived which is then applied to the contemporary situation. Former Supreme Court justice Antonin Scalia believed that the text of the constitution should mean the same thing today as it did when it had been written. A report in The Washington Post suggested that originalism was the "view that the Constitution should be interpreted in accordance with its original meaning — that is, the meaning it had at the time of its enactment."
- Moral Reasoning, commonly referred to as the "ethos of the law", argues that "certain moral concepts or ideals underlie some terms in the text of the Constitution" and that the Court should account for these underlying concepts throughout their interpretation on a case.
- Prudentialism discourages judges from setting broad rules for possible future cases, and advises courts to play a limited role.
- Precedent is judges deciding a case by looking to the decision of a previous and similar case according to the legal principle of stare decisis, by finding a rule or principle in an earlier case to guide their judgment in a current case.
- Strict constructionism involves judges interpreting the text only as it was written; once a clear meaning has been established, there is no need for further analysis, based on this way, which advocates that judges should avoid drawing inferences from previous statutes or the constitution and instead focus on exactly what was written. For example, Justice Hugo Black argued that the First Amendment's wording in reference to certain civil rights that Congress shall make no law should mean exactly that: no law, no exceptions.
- Legal structuralism is a way judges use by searching for the meaning of a particular constitutional principle only by "reading it against the larger constitutional document or context," according to Finn. Judges try to understand how a particular ruling fits within the larger structure of the entire constitution. Structuralism encompasses both functionalist and formalist approaches.
- Textualism primarily interprets the law based on the ordinary meaning of the legal text. A good example of multiple approaches to textualism comes in Bostock v. Clayton County where both the majority opinion and dissents adopted a textualist approach; the only difference was "what flavor of textualism the Supreme Court should employ." The majority opinion, written by Justice Neil Gorsuch, utilizes a very narrow and literal textualist interpretation, which is essential to the ruling in Bostock and the precedent it set. The dissenters (Justice Brett Kavanaugh, Justice Samuel Alito, and Justice Clarence Thomas), claim the correct textualist interpretation to apply is ordinary meaning and not the literal meaning used by the majority opinion. Legal realists and other skeptics would point to this as an example of the contradictions in claiming one judge's subjective interpretation will somehow lead to a more objective judicial analysis than methods (e.g. pragmatism) used by "nontextualists."

== Frequently used vocabulary ==
Examples of phrases which have been the subject of judicial interpretation include:

- The words "arising out of" in relation to insurance policies
- The phrase "direct loss and/or expense" within Joint Contracts Tribunal contracts' terms and conditions.
- In commercial contracts, phrases indicative of additional similar matters, such as "or other causes beyond our control", the rule which in statutory interpretation is referred to as eiusdem generis does not apply.

== See also ==
- Constitutional economics
- Constitutionalism
- Jurisprudence
- Judicial misconduct
- Indeterminacy debate in legal theory
- Rule according to higher law
- Separation of powers
- Statutory interpretation
