= Statutes (Definition of Time) Act 1880 =

Act of the Parliament of the United Kingdom

Statutes (Definition of Time) Act 1880 (Note: Section 2.)
- Act of Parliament
- Parliament of the United Kingdom
- Long title: An Act to remove doubts as to the meaning of Expressions relative to Time occurring in Acts of Parliament, deeds, and other legal instruments.
- Citation: 43 & 44 Vict. c. 9
- Introduced by: Sir Charles Cameron MP (Commons)
- Territorial extent: United Kingdom

Dates
- Royal assent: 2 August 1880
- Commencement: 2 August 1880 (Note: The Acts of Parliament (Commencement) Act 1793.)
- Repealed: 1 January 1979
Other legislation
Repealed by	Interpretation Act 1978
Relates to	Interpretation Act 1850; Summer Time Act 1916; Summer Time Act 1922; Summer Time Act 1947; Summer Time Act 1972

Status: Repealed

History of passage through Parliament

Records of Parliamentary debate relating to the statute from Hansard

Text of statute as originally enacted

The Statutes (Definition of Time) Act 1880 (43 & 44 Vict. c. 9) was an act of the Parliament of the United Kingdom that legally adopted Greenwich Mean Time throughout the island of Great Britain and Dublin Mean Time throughout Ireland.

== Background ==
In the United Kingdom, acts of Parliament remain in force until expressly repealed. Blackstone's Commentaries on the Laws of England, published in the late 18th-century, raised questions about the system and structure of the common law and the poor drafting and disorder of the existing statute book.

In 1850, the Interpretation Act 1850 (13 & 14 Vict. c. 21), also known as Lord Brougham's Act, was passed, that simplified the language that was used in statutes.

Under common law, the time of day varied according to the longitude. However, the advent of the railways made uniformity essential. In 1858, the legal case Curtis v March held "local mean time" to be the official time. On 14 May 1880, a letter signed by 'Clerk to Justices' appeared in The Times, stating that "Greenwich time is now kept almost throughout England, but it appears that Greenwich time is not legal time."

== Passage ==
Leave to bring in the Statutes (Definition of Time) Bill was granted to Sir Charles Cameron MP, David Jenkins MP, and Sir George Errington MP on 16 June 1880. The Bill had its first reading in the House of Commons on 16 June 1880, presented by Sir Charles Cameron MP MP. The Bill had its second reading in the House of Commons on 30 June 1880 and was committed to a Committee of the Whole House, which met and reported on 5 July 1880, without amendments. The amended Bill had its third reading in the House of Commons on 8 July 1880 and passed, without amendments.

The Bill had its first reading in the House of Lords on 9 July 1880. The Bill had its second reading in the House of Lords on X and was committed to a Committee of the Whole House, which met on 16 July 1880 and reported on 19 July 1880, without amendments. The Bill had its third reading in the House of Lords on 20 July 1880 and passed, without amendments.

The bill was granted royal assent on 2 August 1880.

== Provisions ==
Section 1 of the act provided that any expression of time occurs in any act of parliament, deed or other legal instrument, shall be held to be Greenwich Mean Time for Great Britain and Dublin Mean Time for Ireland, unless otherwise specifically stated.

Section 2 of the act provided that the act may be cited as the Statutes (Definition of Time) Act 1880.

== Subsequent developments ==
GMT was adopted on the Isle of Man on 30 March 1883, Jersey in 1898, and Guernsey in 1913. Ireland adopted GMT in 1916, supplanting Dublin Mean Time.

The whole act was repealed by section 25(1) of, and schedule 3 to, the Interpretation Act 1978, which came into force on 1 January 1979. Section 13 of the act replaced the provisions in this act:

13. Subject to section 3 of the [1972 c. 6.] Summer Time Act 1972 (construction of references to points of time during the period of summer time), whenever an expression of time occurs in an Act, the time referred to shall, unless it is otherwise specifically stated, be held to be Greenwich mean time.

== See also ==
- Interpretation Act
- Statute Law Revision Act
- Time in the United Kingdom
