= Interpretation Act 1889 =

Act of the Parliament of the United Kingdom

Interpretation Act 1889 (Note: Section 43.)
- Act of Parliament
- Parliament of the United Kingdom
- Long title: An Act for consolidating enactments relating to the Construction of Acts of Parliament and for further shortening the Language used in Acts of Parliament.
- Citation: 52 & 53 Vict. c. 63
- Introduced by: Hardinge Giffard, 1st Baron Halsbury (Lords)
- Territorial extent: United Kingdom

Dates
- Royal assent: 30 August 1889
- Commencement: 1 January 1890 (Note: Section 42.)
- Repealed: England and Wales and Scotland: 1 January 1979; Northern Ireland: 18 April 1979 (Note: The Judicature (Northern Ireland) Act 1978 (Commencement No. 4) Order 1979.)
Other legislation
Amends	See § Repealed enactments
Repeals/revokes	See § Repealed enactments
Amended by	Statute Law Revision Act 1908; Government of Ireland Act 1920; Rating and Valuation Act 1925; Statute of Westminster 1931; Indian and Colonial Divorce Jurisdiction Act 1940; Burma Independence Act 1947; Representation of the People Act 1948; National Loans Act 1968; Justices of the Peace Act 1968; Courts Act 1971; Bail Act 1976; Administration of Justice Act 1977
Repealed by	England and Wales and Scotland: Interpretation Act 1978; Northern Ireland: Judicature (Northern Ireland) Act 1978
Relates to	Acts of Parliament (Commencement) Act 1793; Statutes (Definition of Time) Act 1880; Interpretation Act 1921; Interpretation Act (Northern Ireland) 1954; Interpretation Act 1978

Status: Repealed

History of passage through Parliament

Records of Parliamentary debate relating to the statute from Hansard

Text of statute as originally enacted

The Interpretation Act 1889 (52 & 53 Vict. c. 63) was an act of the Parliament of the United Kingdom that consolidated enactments relating to statutory construction and provided definitions to shorten the language used in acts of Parliament.

In Northern Ireland, Section 48(2) of the Interpretation Act (Northern Ireland) 1954 provided that without prejudice to 48(1) of that act, the Interpretation Act 1889 was to cease to apply to the interpretation of enactments. The whole act, except paragraphs (4), (5) and (14) of section 13 in their application to Northern Ireland, was repealed by section 25(1) of, and schedule 3 to, the Interpretation Act 1978.

In the Republic of Ireland, the application of the Interpretation Act 1889 was restricted to pre-1924 legislation by the Interpretation Act 1923, and repealed by the Interpretation Act 2005.

== Background ==
In the United Kingdom, acts of Parliament remain in force until expressly repealed. Blackstone's Commentaries on the Laws of England, published in the late 18th-century, raised questions about the system and structure of the common law and the poor drafting and disorder of the existing statute book.

In 1806, the Commission on Public Records passed a resolution requesting the production of a report on the best mode of reducing the volume of the statute book. From 1810 to 1825, The Statutes of the Realm was published, providing for the first time the authoritative collection of acts. In 1816, both Houses of Parliament, passed resolutions that an eminent lawyer with 20 clerks be commissioned to make a digest of the statutes, which was declared "very expedient to be done." However, this was never done.

In 1850, the Interpretation Act 1850 (13 & 14 Vict. c. 21) was passed, which consolidated previous acts of parliament relating to statutory construction and simplify the language used in acts of parliament.

At the start of the parliamentary session in 1853, Lord Cranworth announced his intention to the improvement of the statute law and in March 1853, appointed the Board for the Revision of the Statute Law to repeal expired statutes and continue consolidation, with a wider remit that included civil law. The Board issued three reports, recommending the creation of a permanent body for statute law reform.

In 1854, Lord Cranworth appointed the Royal Commission for Consolidating the Statute Law to consolidate existing statutes and enactments of English law. The Commission made four reports. Recommendations made by the Commission were implemented by the Repeal of Obsolete Statutes Act 1856 (19 & 20 Vict. c. 64).

On 17 February 1860, the Attorney General, Sir Richard Bethell told the House of Commons that he had engaged Sir Francis Reilly and A. J. Wood to expurgate the statute book of all acts which, though not expressly repealed, were not in force, working backward from the present time. From 1860 to 1889, Statute Law Revision Acts were passed to repeal enactments which had ceased to be in force or had become necessary, substantially reducing the volume of the statute book.

== Passage ==
The bill had its first reading in the House of Lords on 27 May 1889, introduced by the Lord Chancellor, Hardinge Giffard, 1st Baron Halsbury. The bill had its second reading in the House of Lords on 24 June 1889 and was committed to the Standing Committee for Bills relating to Law, &c. which met and reported on 27 June 1889, with amendments. The amended bill was committed to a Committee of the Whole House, which met and reported on 23 July 1889, without amendments. The amended bill had its third reading in the House of Lords on 26 July 1889 and passed, without amendments.

The bill in the House of Commons on 3 August 1889. The bill had its first reading in the House of Commons on 1 May 1889, presented by George Howell MP. The bill had its second reading in the House of Commons on 14 August 1889, and was unopposed by the government. The bill was committed to a Committee of the Whole House, which met on 24 August 1889 and reported on 26 August 1889, with amendments. The amended bill had its third reading in the House of Commons on 26 August 1889 and passed, with amendments.

The amended bill was considered and agreed to by the House of Lords on 27 August 1889.

The bill was granted royal assent on 30 August 1889.

== Subsequent developments ==
Section 41 and the schedule were repealed by section 1 of, and the schedule to, the Statute Law Revision Act 1908 (8 Edw. 7. c. 49).

Without prejudice to section 17(2)(a) of the Interpretation Act 1978, a reference to the Interpretation Act 1889 or to any provision of that act, whether occurring in another act, in subordinate legislation, in Northern Ireland legislation or in any deed or other instrument or document, must be construed as referring to the Interpretation Act 1978, or to the corresponding provision of the Interpretation Act 1978, as it applies to Acts passed at the time of the reference.

The Interpretation Act 1889, except section 5 thereof (which related to the meaning of "parish") applied to the Interpretation Measure 1925, and to all measures passed by the Church Assembly after that measure, in like manner as it applied to an act of Parliament, and as if that measure and those measures were acts of Parliament.

The whole act was repealed by section 25(1) of, and schedule 3 to, the Interpretation Act 1978, which came into force on 1 January 1979. The act implemented recommendations by the Law Commission.

== Provisions ==
=== Re-enactment of existing Rules ===
==== Section 1 ====
Section 1 of the act provided that for all acts passed after 1850, unless the contrary intention appears:

- Words importing the masculine gender be deemed and taken to include females, unless expressly provided
- The singular be deemed to include the plural and the plural to include the singular, unless expressly provided.
- The same rules shall be observed in the construction of every enactment relating to an offence punishable on indictment or on summary conviction.

This reflected section 4 of Interpretation Act 1850 (13 & 14 Vict. c. 21).

Section 1(1) of the act was updated in the Interpretation Act 1978 to work operate both ways.

==== Section 2 ====
Section 2(2) of the act provided that the word "person" should include body corporates unless the contrary intention appears and that penalties are also able to be paid to body corporates.

==== Section 3 ====
Section 3 of the act provided definitions of words in all acts passed after 1850, unless the contrary intention appears:

Expression	Provision
"month"	shall mean calendar month.
"land"	shall include messuages, tenements, and hereditaments, houses, and buildings of any tenure.
"oath" and "affidavit"	shall, in the case of persons for the time being allowed by law to affirm or declare instead of swearing, include affirmation and declaration, and the expression "swear" shall, in the like case, include affirm and declare.

This section reflected section 4 of the Interpretation Act 1850 (13 & 14 Vict. c. 21).

Section 3 was updated in the Interpretation Act 1978 to be appropriate for Scotland and reflect modern definitions of land, including in the Town and Country Planning Act 1971, Town and Country Planning (Scotland) Act 1972 and the Community Land Act 1975, which covered buildings and structures, lakes, rivers and foreshore, particular estates or interests in land and easements (servitudes in Scotland) and other rights over and in land.

==== Section 4 ====
Section 4 of the act provided that for all acts passed after 1850, the word "county" shall be construed as including a "county of a city and a county of a town", unless the contrary intention appears.

==== Section 5 ====
Section 5 of the act provided that for all acts passed after 1850, the word "parish" as respects England and Wales shall mean a "place for which a poor rate is or can be made, or for which a separate overseer is or can be appointed", unless the contrary intention appears.

Section 5 of the act was repealed by section 69(1) of, and schedule 8 to, the Rating and Valuation Act 1925 (15 & 16 Geo. 5. c. 90), as to England and Wales, except as to the administrative county of London and Isles of Scilly (ss. 70(1) and (2)).

This section was repealed as to the Isles of Scilly by the Isles of Scilly Order 1927 (SR&O 1927/59), p. 1500.

==== Section 6 ====
Section 6 of the act provided that for all acts or orders of council after 1850, the word "county court" as respects England and Wales shall mean a court under the County Courts Act 1888 (51 & 52 Vict. c. 43), unless the contrary intention appears.

==== Section 7 ====
Section 7 of the act provided that for all acts relating to Scotland, unless the contrary intention appears:

Expression	Provision
"sheriff clerk"	shall include steward clerk.
"shire," "sheriffdom," and "county"	shall include any stewartry in Scotland.

==== Section 8 ====
Section 8 of the act provided that every section of an act shall have effect as a substantive enactment without introductory words.

This reflected section 2 of Interpretation Act 1850 (13 & 14 Vict. c. 21). Previously, many acts of parliament, including this act, would prefix each section with a clause such as "And be it further enacted", "provided always" or "Provided always and it be enacted."

==== Section 9 ====
Section 9 of the act provided that all acts passed after 1850 shall is a public act to be judicially noticed as such, unless the contrary intention appears.

This reflected section 7 of Interpretation Act 1850 (13 & 14 Vict. c. 21).

==== Section 10 ====
Section 10 of the act provided that any act may be altered, amended or repealed in the same session of parliament.

This reflected section 2 of Interpretation Act 1850 (13 & 14 Vict. c. 21). Previously, most acts of parliament would included a clause providing that "This Act may be amended or repealed in the present session of Parliament". This was thought to be necessary because all acts of a session were passed simultaneously on the first day of that session until 1793, and the House of Commons had a rule by which decisions of the whole house could not be reversed in the same session.

==== Section 11 ====
Section 11 of the act provided that where an act passed after 1850 repeals a repealing enactment, it shall not revive any enactments, unless words are added reviving that enactment. Section 11 of the act also provided that where an act passed after 1850 substitutes provisions for an enactment, the repealed enactment shall remain in force until the substituted provisions come into operation.

Section 11(1) reflected section 5 of Interpretation Act 1850 (13 & 14 Vict. c. 21). Under common law, once an act was repealed it was treated as if it had never been treated, with the exception of acts past and closed.

Section 11(2) reflected section 6 of Interpretation Act 1850 (13 & 14 Vict. c. 21). This was designed to save words in the commencement section, but has little relevance to modern legislation in which repeals are synchronised with replacements.

=== New general rules of construction ===
==== Section 12 ====
Section 12 of the act provided official definitions of all past and future acts, unless the contrary intention appears.

Expression	Provision
"the Lord Chancellor"	shall, except when used with reference to Ireland only, mean the Lord High Chancellor of Great Britain for the time being, and when used with reference to Ireland only, shall mean the Lord Chancellor of Ireland for the time being.
"the Treasury"	shall mean the Lord High Treasurer for the time being or the Commissioners for the execution of Her Majesty's Treasury.
"Secretary of State"	shall mean one of Her Majesty's Principal Secretaries of State for the time being.
"the Admiralty"	shall mean the Lord High Admiral of the United Kingdom for the time being, or the Commissioners for the time being for executing the office of Lord High Admiral of the Navy.
"the Privy Council"	shall, except when used with reference to Ireland only, mean the Lords and others for the time being of Her Majesty's Most Honourable Privy Council, and when used with reference to Ireland only, shall mean the Privy Council of Ireland for the time being.
"the Education Department"	shall mean the Lords of the Committee for the time being of the Privy Council appointed for Education.
"the Scotch Education Department"	shall mean the Lords of the Committee for the time being of the Privy Council appointed for Education in Scotland.
"the Board of Trade"	shall mean the Lords of the Committee for the time being of the Privy Council appointed for the consideration of matters relating to trade and foreign plantations.
"Lord Lieutenant"	when used with reference to Ireland, shall mean the Lord Lieutenant of Ireland or other Chief Governors or Governor of Ireland for the time being.
"Chief Secretary"	when used with reference to Ireland, shall mean the Chief Secretary to the Lord Lieutenant for the time being.
"Postmaster General"	shall mean Her Majesty's Postmaster General for the time being.
"Commissioners of Woods" or "Commissioners of Woods and Forests"	shall mean the Commissioners of Her Majesty's Woods, Forests, and Land Revenues for the time being.
"Commissioners of Works"	shall mean the Commissioners of Her Majesty's Works and Public Buildings for the time being.
"Charity Commissioners"	shall mean the Charity Commissioners for England and Wales for the time being.
"Ecclesiastical Commissioners"	shall mean the Ecclesiastical Commissioners for England for the time being.
"Queen Anne's Bounty"	shall mean the Governors of the Bounty of Queen Anne for the augmentation of the maintenance of the poor clergy.
"National Debt Commissioners"	shall mean the Commissioners for the time being for the Reduction of the National Debt.
"the Bank of England"	shall mean, as circumstances require, the Governor and Company of the Bank of England or the bank of the Governor and Company of the Bank of England.
"the Bank of Ireland"	shall mean, as circumstances require, the Governor and Company of the Bank of Ireland, or the bank of the Governor and Company of the Bank of Ireland.
"consular officer"	shall include consul-general, consul, vice-consul, consular agent, and any person for the time being authorized to discharge the duties of consul-general, consul, or vice-consul.

==== Section 13 ====
Section 13 provided judicial definitions of all past and future acts, unless the contrary intention appears.

Expression	Provision
"Supreme Court"	when used with reference to England or Ireland, shall mean the Supreme Court of Judicature in England or Ireland, as the case may be, or either branch thereof.
"Court of Appeal"	when used with reference to England or Ireland, shall mean Her Majesty's Court of Appeal in England or Ireland, as the case may be.
"High Court"	when used with reference to England or Ireland, shall mean Her Majesty's High Court of Justice in England or Ireland, as the case may be.
"court of assize"	shall, as respects England, Wales, and Ireland, mean a court of assize, a court of oyer and terminer, and a court of gaol delivery, or any of them, and shall, as respects England and Wales, include the Central Criminal Court.
"assizes"	as respects England, Wales, and Ireland, shall mean the courts of assize usually held in every year, and shall include the sessions of the Central Criminal Court, but shall not include any court of assize held by virtue of any commission of assize or any court held by virtue of the powers conferred by section sixty-three of the Supreme Court of Judicature Act (Ireland), 1877 (40 & 41 Vict. c. 57).
"the Summary Jurisdiction Act, 1848"	shall mean the Act of the session of the eleventh and twelfth years of the reign of Her present Majesty, chapter forty-three, intituled "An Act to facilitate the performance of the duties of justices of the peace out of sessions within England and Wales with respect to summary convictions and orders."
"the Summary Jurisdiction (England) Acts" or "the Summary Jurisdiction (English) Acts"	shall respectively mean the Summary Jurisdiction Act, 1848 (11 & 12 Vict. c. 43), the Summary Jurisdiction Act, 1879 (42 & 43 Vict. c. 49), and any Act, past or future, amending those Acts or either of them.
"the Summary Jurisdiction (Scotland) Acts"	shall mean the Summary Jurisdiction (Scotland) Acts, 1864 (27 & 28 Vict. c. 53) and 1881 (44 & 45 Vict. c. 33), and any Act, past or future, amending those Acts or either of them.
"the Summary Jurisdiction (Ireland) Acts"	shall mean, as respects the Dublin Metropolitan Police District, the Acts regulating the powers and duties of justices of the peace or of the police of that district, and as respects any other part of Ireland, Petty Sessions (Ireland) Act, 1851 (14 & 15 Vict. c. 93), and any Act, past or future, amending the same.
"the Summary Jurisdiction Acts"	when used in relation to England or Wales shall mean the Summary Jurisdiction (England) Acts, and when used in relation to Scotland the Summary Jurisdiction (Scotland) Acts, and when used in relation to Ireland the Summary Jurisdiction (Ireland) Acts.
"court of summary jurisdiction"	shall mean any justice or justices of the peace, or other magistrate, by whatever name called, to whom jurisdiction is given by, or who is authorised to act under, the Summary Jurisdiction Acts, whether in England, Wales, or Ireland, and whether acting under the Summary Jurisdiction Acts or any of them, or under any other Act, or by virtue of his commission, or under the common law.
"petty sessional court"	shall, as respects England or Wales, mean a court of summary jurisdiction consisting of two or more justices when sitting in a petty sessional court-house, and shall include the Lord Mayor of the city of London, and any alderman of that city, and any metropolitan or borough police magistrate or other stipendiary magistrate when sitting in a court-house or place at which he is authorised by law to do alone any act authorised to be done by more than one justice of the peace.
"petty sessional court-house"	shall, as respects England or Wales, mean a court-house or other place at which justices are accustomed to assemble for holding special or petty sessions, or which is for the time being appointed as a substitute for such a court-house or place, and where the justices are accustomed to assemble for either special or petty sessions at more than one court-house or place in a petty sessional division, shall mean any such court-house or place. The expression shall also include any court-house or place at which the Lord Mayor of the city of London or any alderman of that city, or any metropolitan or borough police magistrate or other stipendiary magistrate is authorised by law to do alone any act authorised to be done by more than one justice of the peace.
"court of quarter sessions"	shall mean the justices of any county, riding, parts, division, or liberty of a county, or of any county of a city, or county of a town, in general or quarter sessions assembled, and shall include the court of the recorder of a municipal borough having a separate court of quarter sessions.

Section 13 was amended for Ireland by sections 38 to 43, 46, 47 and 49 of, and schedule 7 to, the Government of Ireland Act 1920 (10 & 11 Geo. 5. c. 67).

In this section, paragraphs (4), (5) and (14) as they applied to Northern Ireland were repealed by section 122(2) of, and part I of schedule 7 to, the Judicature (Northern Ireland) Act 1978.

==== Section 14 ====
Section 14 of the act provided that the expression "rules of the court" when used in relation to any court shall mean "rules made by the authority having for the time being power to make rules or orders regulating the practice and procedures of such court", and as regards Scotland include "acts of adjournal and acts of sederunt", unless the contrary intention appears.

==== Section 15 ====
Section 15 of the act provided definitions of the word "borough" for every past and future act, unless the contrary intention appears.

Expression	Provision
"municipal borough"	shall mean, as respects England and Wales, any place for the time being subject to the Municipal Corporations Act, 1882 (45 & 46 Vict. c. 50), and any reference to the mayor, aldermen, and burgesses of a borough shall include a reference to the mayor, aldermen, and citizens of a city, and any reference to the powers, duties, liabilities or property of the council of a borough shall be construed as a reference to the powers, duties, liabilities, or property of the mayor, aldermen, and burgesses of the borough acting by the council.
"municipal borough"	shall mean, as respects Ireland, any place for the time being subject to the Act of the session of the third and fourth years of the reign of Her present Majesty, chapter one hundred and eight, intituled "An Act for the regulation of municipal corporations in Ireland."
"parliamentary borough"	shall mean any borough, burgh, place or combination of places returning a member or members to serve in Parliament, and not being either a county or division of a county, or a university, or a combination of universities.
"borough"	when used in relation to local government shall mean a municipal borough as above defined, and when used in relation to parliamentary elections or the registration of parliamentary electors shall mean a parliamentary borough as above defined.

Section 15(3) of the act was repealed by section 80(7) of, and schedule 13 to, the Representation of the People Act 1948 (11 & 12 Geo. 6. c. 65), which came into force on 30 July 1948.

In section 15(4) of the act, the words from "and" onwards were repealed by section 80(7) of, and schedule 13 to, the Representation of the People Act 1948 (11 & 12 Geo. 6. c. 65), which came into force on 30 July 1948.

==== Section 16 ====
Section 16 of the act provided definitions of guardians and unions for all past and future acts, unless the contrary intention appears.

Expression	Provision
"board of guardians"	shall, as respects England and Wales, mean a board of guardians elected under the Poor Law Amendment Act, 1834, and the Acts amending the same, and shall include a board of guardians or other body of persons performing under any local Act the like functions to a board of guardians under the Poor Law Amendment Act, 1834.
"poor law union"	shall, as respects England and Wales, mean any parish or union of parishes for which there is a separate board of guardians.
"board of guardians"	shall, as respects Ireland, mean a board of guardians elected under the Act of the Session of the first and second years of the reign of Her present Majesty, chapter fifty-six, intituled "An Act for the more effectual relief of the destitute poor in Ireland," and the Acts amending the same, and shall include any body of persons appointed by the Local Government Board for Ireland to carry into execution the provisions of those Acts.
"poor law union"	shall, as respects Ireland, mean any townland or place or union, or townlands or places, for which there is a separate board of guardians.

==== Section 17 ====
Section 17 of the act provided definitions of words relating to elections for all past and future acts, unless the contrary intention appears.

Expression	Provision
"parliamentary election"	shall mean the election of a member or members to serve in Parliament for a county or division of a county, or parliamentary borough or division of a parliamentary borough, or for a university or combination of universities.
"parliamentary register of electors"	shall mean a register of persons entitled to vote at any parliamentary election.
"local government register of electors"	shall mean as respects an administrative county in England or Wales other than a county borough, the county register, and as respects a county borough or other municipal borough, the burgess roll.

In section 17(1) of the act, the words "or members" were repealed by section 80(7) of, and schedule 13 to, the Representation of the People Act 1948 (11 & 12 Geo. 6. c. 65), which came into force on 30 July 1948.

Sections 17(2) and (3) were repealed by section 80(7) of, and schedule 13 to, the Representation of the People Act 1948 (11 & 12 Geo. 6. c. 65), which came into force on 30 July 1948.

==== Section 18 ====
Section 18 of the act provided definitions of geographical or colonial words for all past and future acts, unless the contrary intention appears.

Expression	Provision
"British Islands"	shall mean the United Kingdom, the Channel Islands, and the Isle of Man.
"British possession"	shall mean any part of Her Majesty's dominions exclusive of the United Kingdom, and where parts of such dominions are under both a central and a local legislature, all parts under the central legislature shall, for the purposes of this definition, be deemed to be one British possession.
"colony"	shall mean any part of Her Majesty's dominions exclusive of the British Islands, and of British India, and where parts of such dominions are under both a central and a local legislature, all parts under the central legislature shall, for the purposes of this definition, be deemed to be one colony.
"British India"	shall mean all territories and places within Her Majesty's dominions which are for the time being governed by Her Majesty through the Governor-General of India or through any governor or other officer subordinate to the Governor-General of India.
"India"	shall mean British India together with any territories of any native prince or chief under the suzerainty of Her Majesty exercised through the Governor-General of India, or through any governor or other officer subordinate to the Governor-General of India.
"Governor"	shall, as respects Canada and India, mean the Governor-General, and include any person who for the time being has the powers of the Governor-General, and as respects any other British possession, shall include the officer for the time being administering the government of that possession.
"colonial legislature" and "legislature"	when used with reference to a British possession, shall respectively mean the authority, other than the Imperial Parliament or Her Majesty in Council, competent to make laws for a British possession.

Section 18(3) was restricted by section 11 of the Statute of Westminster 1931 (22 & 23 Geo. 5. c. 4) which provided that notwithstanding anything in the Interpretation Act 1889, the expression "Colony" did not, in any act of the Parliament of the United Kingdom passed after the commencement of the Statute of Westminster 1931, include a dominion or any province or state forming part of a dominion. A dominion for the purposes of the act meant only those dominions described in section 1, being the Dominion of Canada, the Commonwealth of Australia, the Dominion of New Zealand, the Union of South Africa, the Irish Free State and Newfoundland.

In section 18(3), the words "and of British Burma" were repealed by section 5(3) of, and part I of Schedule 2 to, the Burma Independence Act 1947 (11 & 12 Geo. 6. c. 3).

Sections 18(4) and (5) were omitted by the Government of India (Adaptation of Acts of Parliament) Order 1937 (SR&O 1937/230), p. 965.

In section 18(6), the words "outside British India" were inserted by the Government of India (Adaptation of Acts of Parliament) Order 1937 (SR&O 1937/230), p. 965.

==== Section 18A ====
Section 18A of the act was inserted by the Government of India (Adaptation of Acts of Parliament) Order 1937 (SR&O 1937/230), p. 965.

So much of section 18A as provided that the expression "Governor-General", in relation to the period between the commencement of Part III of the Government of India Act 1935, and the establishment of the Federation of India, meant the governor-general in council, did not apply to section 6 of the Indian and Colonial Divorce Jurisdiction Act 1940.

In section 18A(2), the words "or the Government of Burma Act, 1935" were repealed by section 5(3) of, and part I of Schedule 2 to, the Burma Independence Act 1947.

==== Section 19 ====
Section 19 of the act provided that for all past and future acts, the expression "person" shall include "any body of persons corporate or unincorporate", unless the contrary intention appears.

==== Section 20 ====
Section 20 of the act provided that for all past and future acts, expressions referring to writing shall be construed as including references to "printing, lithography, photography, and other modes of representing or reproducing words in a visible form", unless the contrary intention appears.

==== Section 21 ====
Section 21 of the act provided that for all past and future acts, the expression "statutory declaration" shall mean a declaration made by virtue of the Statutory Declarations Act 1835 (5 & 6 Will. 4 c. 62), unless the contrary intention appears.

==== Section 22 ====
Section 22 of the act provided that for all past and future acts, the expression "financial year" shall mean as respects any matters related to the consolidated fund or money provided by Parliament or to the Exchequer, or to Imperial taxes or finance, the twelve months ending 31 March.

In the Republic of Ireland, this section was disapplied by section 2(3) of the Exchequer and Local Financial Years Act 1974.

==== Section 23 ====
Section 23 of the act provided definitions for the Land Clauses Acts to mean:

Jurisdiction	Meaning (including any acts amending the same)
England and Wales	Land Clauses Consolidation Act 1845 (8 & 9 Vict. c. 18); Land Clauses Consolidation Acts Amendment Act 1860 (23 & 24 Vict. c. 106); Land Clauses Consolidation Act 1869 (32 & 33 Vict. c. 18); Land Clauses (Umpire) Act 1883 (46 & 47 Vict. c. 15)
Scotland	Land Clauses Consolidation (Scotland) Act 1845 (8 & 9 Vict. c. 19); Land Clauses Consolidation Acts Amendment Act 1860 (23 & 24 Vict. c. 106)
Ireland	Land Clauses Consolidation Act 1845 (8 & 9 Vict. c. 18); Land Clauses Consolidation Acts Amendment Act 1860 (23 & 24 Vict. c. 106); Railways Act (Ireland) 1851 (14 & 15 Vict. c. 70); Railways Act (Ireland) 1860 (27 & 28 Vict. c. 71); Railways Traverse Act (31 & 32 Vict. c. 70)

==== Section 24 ====
Section 24 of the act provided that for all past and future acts, the expression "Irish Valuation Acts" shall mean acts relating to the valuation of rateable property in Ireland.

==== Section 25 ====
Section 25 of the act provided that for all past and future acts, the expression "ordnance map" shall mean a map made under the powers conferred by the Survey (Great Britain) Acts, 1841 to 1870 or the Survey (Ireland) Acts, 1825 to 1870, and acts amending the same, unless contrary intention appears.

==== Section 26 ====
Section 26 of the act provided that for all past and future acts that authorise or require any document to be served by post, whether the expression "serve". "give", "send" or other is used, service shall be "deemed to be effected by properly addressing, prepaying, and posting a letter containing the document, and unless the contrary is proved to have been effected at the time at which the letter would be delivered in the ordinary course of post", unless contrary intention appears.

This brings in supporting provisions for acts which expressly authorise postal service. In common law, notices or documents given or served were required to be handed to the party concerned.

==== Section 27 ====
Section 27 of the act provided that for all future acts, the expression "committed for trial" used in relation to any person shall, as respects England and Wales, mean "committed to prison with the view of being tried before a judge and jury, whether the person is committed in pursuance of section twenty-two or of section twenty-five of the Indicatable Offences Act, 1848 (11 & 12 Vict. c. 42), or is committed by a court, judge, coroner, or other authority having power to commit a person to any prison with a view to his trial, and shall include a person who is admitted to bail upon a recognizance to appear and take his trial before a judge and jury".

Section 27 was updated in the Interpretation Act 1978 to define "committed for trial" and to extend the definition to Northern Ireland.

==== Section 28 ====
Section 28 of the act provided definitions of the expressions "sheriff", "felony" and "misdemeanour" for all future acts, unless the contrary intention appears.

Expression	Provision
"sheriff"	shall, as respects Scotland, include a sheriff substitute.
"felony"	shall, as respects Scotland, mean a high crime and offence.
"misdemeanour"	shall, as respects Scotland, mean an offence.

==== Section 29 ====
Section 29 of the act provided that for all future acts, the expression "county court" as respects Ireland shall mean a "civil bill court within the meaning of the County Officers and Courts Ireland Act, 1877 (40 & 41 Vict. c. 56)".

==== Section 30 ====
Section 30 of the act provided that for all past and future acts, references to the sovereign reigning at the time of the passing of the act, or to "the Crown" shall be construed as references to the sovereign for the time being, binding on the crown, unless the contrary intention appears.

==== Section 31 ====
Section 31 of the act provided that for all past and future acts, expressions used in orders in council, orders, warrants, schemes, letters patent, rules, regulations or byelaws made by an act shall have the same respective meanings as in the act conferring the power, unless the contrary intention appears.

==== Section 32 ====
Section 32(1) of the act provided that where any future act confers a power or imposes a duty, that power may be exercised and the duty performed from time to time as occasion requires, unless the contrary intention appears.

This sub-section was originally enacted to counteract the risk of restrictive interpretation, but are not little more than statements of the obvious.

Section 32(2) of the act provided where any future act confers a power or imposes a duty on the holder of an office, that power may be exercised and the duty performed by the holder from time to time as occasion requires, unless the contrary intention appears.

Section 32(3) provided that where any future act confers a power to make any rules, regulations or byelaws, the power shall be construed as including a "power, exerciseable in the like manner and subject to the like consent and conditions, if any, to rescinding, revoke, amend or vary the rules, regulations or byelaws, unless the contrary intention appears."

Section 32 was updated in the Interpretation Act 1978 to extend the provisions to orders in council, orders and other types of subordinate legislation made by statutory instruments and to cover explicitly powers of amendment and revocation.

==== Section 33 ====
Section 33 of the act provided that where an act or omission constitutes an offence under two or more laws, the offender shall be liable to be prosecuted under either or any of those laws but not twice for the same offence, unless the contrary intention appears.

This section eliminated the need for savings in acts that create new offences already occupied by other legislation or by the common law.

==== Section 34 ====
Section 34 of the act provided that for all future acts the measurement of distance shall be measured in a straight line on a horizontal plane, unless the contrary intention appears.

==== Section 35 ====
Section 35 of the act provided for the citation of acts.

Section 35(1) provided that acts may be cited by reference to the short title (with or without the reference), or by reference to the regnal year in which the act was passed, and where there are more statures or sessions than one in the same regnal year, by reference to the statute or the session, as the case may require, and where there are more chapters than one, by reference to the chapter. Section 35(1) also provided that any enactment may be cited by reference to the section or sub-section of the act in which the enactment is contained.

Section 35(2) of the act provided that where any future act contains such a reference, the reference shall be read as referring, in the case of statutes included in any revised edition of the statutes purporting to be printed by authority, to that edition, and in the case of statutes not so included, and passed before the reign of King George the First, to the edition prepared under the direction of the Record Commission, and in other cases to the copies of the statutes purporting to be printed by the Queen's Printer or under the superintendence of or authority of Her Majesty's Stationery Office.

Section 35(3) of the act provided that for all future acts, a description or citation of a portion of another act shall be construed as including the word, section, or other part mentioned or referred to as forming the beginning and as forming the end of the portion compromised in the description or citation.

Section 35(3) is the opposite to parliamentary proceedings where an amendment to leave out "from X to Y" leaves both X and Y standing in the text.

Section 35 was updated in the Interpretation Act 1978 to address modern practices of citing acts by calendar year and chapter number and to authorise citation of subordinate legislation, including by orders in council or by statutory instruments and to ensure references to enactments are as the act stands at the time of reference, not as originally passed.

==== Section 36 ====
Section 36(1) of the act provided that for all past and future acts, the expression "commencement" shall mean the time at which the act comes into operation.

Section 36(2) of the act provided that where a future act, or any order in council, order, warrant, scheme, letters patent, rules, regulations or byelaws made, granted, or issued, under a power conferred by any such act, is expressed to come into operation on a particular day, the same shall be construed as coming into operation immediately on the expiration of the previous day.

Section 36(2) was updated in the Interpretation Act 1978 to reflect the modern practice of commencing different provisions of the same by order or statutory instrument.

==== Section 37 ====
Section 37 of the act provided that where a future act does not commence immediately and confers powers to make any appointment, to make, grant or issue any instrument or to do any other things for the purposes of the act, that power may be exercised at any time after the passing of the act, so far as may be necessary or expedient for the purpose of bringing the act into operation.

This section was enacted to make it unnecessary to fend off challenges to commencement clauses of individual acts.

Section 37 was amended in the Interpretation Act 1978 to reflect the modern practice of commencing different provisions of the same by order or statutory instrument.

==== Section 38 ====
Section 38 of the act contained the Westbury Saving present in the Statute Law Revision Acts, explicitly preventing any repeal from affecting the interpretation of any statute still in force and retaining any right, benefit, claim, liability, principle of law and court jurisdiction that had previously arisen under a repealed act.

Section 38 of the act had the same effect in relation to any repeal by the Judicature (Northern Ireland) Act 1978 of a statutory provision other than an act of the Parliament of the United Kingdom as it had in relation to the repeal by the Judicature (Northern Ireland) Act 1978 of such an act.

Section 38 was updated in the Interpretation Act 1978 to address ambiguity surrounding "and any other act", to cover references to enactments repealed and re-enacted, to reflect the occasional practice of temporary acts and cover savings in legislation such as the Prevention of Terrorism (Temporary Provisions) Act 1989 and to apply to acts of the Parliament of Northern Ireland.

=== Supplemental ===
==== Section 39 ====
Section 39 of the act provided that the definition of "act" in the act shall include local, personal and private acts.

==== Section 40 ====
Section 40 of the act provided that the provisions of the act respecting the construction of the act passed after the commencement of the act shall not affect construction of any act passed before the commencement of the act, although continued or amended by an act passed after such commencement.

==== Section 41 ====
Section 41 of the act repealed 8 enactments, listed in the schedule to the act.

===== Repealed enactments =====
Citation	Short title	Title	Extent of repeal
7 & 8 Geo. 4. c. 28	Lands of Tilson (Receiver-General) Act 1826	An Act for further improving the administration of justice in criminal cases in England.	Section fourteen.
9 Geo. 4. c. 54	Criminal Law (Ireland) Act 1828	An Act for improving the administration of justice in criminal cases in Ireland.	Section thirty-five.
7 Will. 4 & 1 Vict. c. 39	Interpretation of Terms Act 1837	An Act to interpret the word "sheriff," "sheriff clerk," "shire," "sheriffdom," and "county," occurring in Acts of Parliament relating to Scotland.	The whole act.
13 & 14 Vict. c. 21	Interpretation Act 1850	An Act for shortening the language used in Acts of Parliament.	The whole act.
29 & 30 Vict. c. 113	Poor Law Amendment Act 1866	The Poor Law Amendment Act of 1866.	Section eighteen, from the beginning to "can be appointed, and."
42 & 43 Vict. c. 49	Summary Jurisdiction Act 1879	The Summary Jurisdiction Act, 1879.	In section twenty the words numbered (3) and (5).
47 & 48 Vict. c. 43	Summary Jurisdiction Act 1884	The Summary Jurisdiction Act, 1884.	Section seven.
51 & 52 Vict. c. 43	County Courts Act 1888	The County Courts Act, 1888	Section eighty-seven, from the beginning to "is meant, and."

==== Section 42 ====
Section 42 of the act provided that the act shall commence on 1 January 1890.

==== Section 43 ====
Section 43 of the act provided that the act may be cited as the "Interpretation Act, 1889".

== See also ==
- Ex post facto law
- Coming into force
- Interpretation Act
- Statute Law Revision Act

== Bibliography ==
- J M Lely. "Interpretation Act, 1889". The Statutes of Practical Utility. (Chitty's Statutes). Fifth Edition. 1894. vol 1. title "Act of Parliament". pp 7 to 20.
- Paterson and Cotton. The Practical Statutes of the Session 1889. 1889. Part I. pp 303 to 326.
- Arnold, Mackenzie and Johnson. "Interpretation". The Law Relating to Municipal Corporations in England and Wales. Fourth Edition. 1894. Chapter 11. pp 743 to 756.
