= Harmonious construction =

Harmonious construction is a principle of statutory interpretation used in the legal system. It holds that when two provisions of a legal text seem to conflict, they should be interpreted so that each has a separate effect and neither is redundant or nullified.
