= Interpretation (Amendment) Act 1993 =

Law promoting gender-inclusive legislative interpretation

Oireachtas
- Long title: AN ACT TO AMEND THE INTERPRETATION ACT 1937.
- Citation: No. 35 of 1993
- Signed: 22 December 1993
- Repealed: 1 January 2006

Legislative history
- Bill citation: No. 55 of 1993
- Introduced by: Minister for Equality and Law Reform (Mervyn Taylor)
- Introduced: 7 March 1961

Repealed by
- Interpretation Act 2005
- Status: Repealed

The Interpretation (Amendment) Act 1993 was an Interpretation Act passed by the Oireachtas in order to promote gender-inclusive language. It supplemented the Interpretation Act 1937 by providing that (as well as the pre-existing rule that the masculine includes feminine) the feminine gender would also be taken to include the masculine.

The Act was repealed and re-enacted by the Interpretation Act 2005. Section 18(b)(ii) of that Act provides, "In an Act passed on or after 22 December 1993, and in a statutory instrument made after that date, a word importing the feminine gender shall be read as also importing the masculine gender".
