= List of acts of the Parliament of Australia from 1901 =

This is a list of acts of the Parliament of Australia for the year 1901.

See also the list of acts of the Parliament of Australia.

Not all acts were assigned a short title.

== 1901 ==
Short title, or popular name	Citation	Royal assent
Long title
	No. 1 of 1901	25 June 1901
An Act to grant and apply out of the Consolidated Revenue Fund the sum of Four hundred and ninety-one thousand eight hundred and eighty-two pounds to the service of the period ending the thirtieth day of June One thousand nine hundred and one. (Repealed by Statute Law Revision Act 1934 (No. 45))
Acts Interpretation Act 1901	No. 2 of 1901	12 July 1901
An Act for the Interpretation of Acts of Parliament and for Shortening their Language.
	No. 3 of 1901	12 July 1901
An Act to grant and apply out of the Consolidated Revenue Fund the sum of One million ten thousand seven hundred and thirty-two pounds to the service of the year ending the thirtieth day of June One thousand nine hundred and two. (Repealed by Statute Law Revision Act 1934 (No. 45))
Audit Act 1901 (repealed)	No. 4 of 1901	7 August 1901
An Act to make provision for the Collection and Payment of the Public Moneys the Audit of the Public Accounts and the Protection and Recovery of Public Property and for other purposes. (Repealed by Audit (Transitional and Miscellaneous) Amendment Act 1997 (No. 152))
State Laws and Records Recognition Act 1901 (repealed)	No. 5 of 1901	5 September 1901
An Act to provide for the recognition throughout the Commonwealth of the Laws, the Public Acts and Records, and the Judicial Proceedings of the States. (Repealed by Evidence (Transitional Provisions and Consequential Amendments) Act 1995 (No. 3))
Customs Act 1901	No. 6 of 1901	3 October 1901
An Act relating to the Customs.
Beer Excise Act 1901 (repealed)	No. 7 of 1901	5 October 1901
An Act relating to Excise on Beer. (Repealed by Beer Excise Act Repeal Act 1968 (No. 107))
Distillation Act 1901 (repealed)	No. 8 of 1901	5 October 1901
An Act relating to Distillation. (Repealed by Excise Laws Amendment (Fuel Tax Reform and Other Measures) Act 2006 (No. 74))
Excise Act 1901	No. 9 of 1901	5 October 1901
An Act relating to Excise.
	No. 10 of 1901	12 October 1901
An Act to grant and apply out of the Consolidated Revenue Fund the sum of Nine hundred and twenty-eight thousand three hundred and twenty-two pounds to the service of the year ending the thirtieth day of June One thousand nine hundred and two. (Repealed by Statute Law Revision Act 1934 (No. 45))
Service and Execution of Process Act 1901 (repealed)	No. 11 of 1901	16 October 1901
An Act to provide for the Service and Execution throughout the Commonwealth of the Civil and Criminal Process and the Judgments of the Courts of the States and of other parts of the Commonwealth, and for other purposes connected therewith. (Repealed by Service and Execution of Process (Transitional Provisions and Consequential Amendments) Act 1992 (No. 166))
Post and Telegraph Act 1901 (repealed)	No. 12 of 1901	16 November 1901
An Act relating to the Postal and Telegraphic Services of the Commonwealth. (Repealed by Postal and Telecommunications Commissions (Transitional Provisions) Act 1975 (No. 56))
Property for Public Purposes Acquisition Act 1901 (repealed)	No. 13 of 1901	12 December 1901
An Act to provide for the Acquisition of Property for Public Purposes, for dealing with Property so acquired, and for other purposes connected therewith. (Repealed by Lands Acquisition Act 1906 (No. 13))
Punishment of Offences Act 1901 (repealed)	No. 14 of 1901	17 December 1901
An Act to make provision for the Punishment of Offences against the Laws of the Commonwealth. (Repealed by Statute Law Revision Act 1934 (No. 45))
	No. 15 of 1901	17 December 1901
An Act to grant and apply out of the Consolidated Revenue Fund the sum of Four hundred and ten thousand seven hundred and sixty-seven pounds to the service of the year ending the thirtieth day of June One thousand nine hundred and two. (Repealed by Statute Law Revision Act 1934 (No. 45))
Pacific Island Labourers Act 1901 (repealed)	No. 16 of 1901	17 December 1901
An Act to provide for the Regulation, Restriction, and Prohibition of the Introduction of Labourers from the Pacific Islands and for other purposes. (Repealed by Migration Act 1958 (No. 62))
Immigration Restriction Act 1901 (repealed)	No. 17 of 1901	23 December 1901
An Act to place certain restrictions on Immigration and to provide for the removal from the Commonwealth of prohibited Immigrants. (Repealed by Migration Act 1958 (No. 62))

== Sources ==
- "legislation.gov.au".
