= Interpretation Measure 1925 =

Church of England measure

Interpretation Measure 1925 (Note: Section 7.)
- Measure of the Church of England
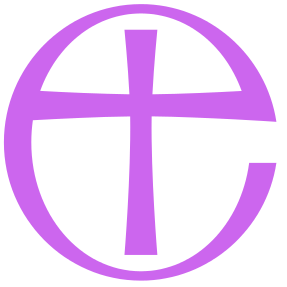
- National Assembly of the Church of England
- Long title: A Measure passed by the National Assembly of the Church of England. To provide for the construction of the Constitution of the National Assembly of the Church of England referred to in theM1 Church of England Assembly (Powers) Act 1919 and for the construction and proof of Measures passed under that Act.
- Citation: 15 & 16 Geo. 5. No. 1
- Territorial extent: United Kingdom

Dates
- Royal assent: 28 May 1925
- Commencement: 28 May 1925 (Note: The Acts of Parliament (Commencement) Act 1793.)

Other legislation
- Amended by: Interpretation Act 1978; Synodical Government Measure 1969; Statute Law (Repeals) Act 2004; Church Representation and Ministers Measure 2019
- Relates to: Interpretation Act 1889

Status: Amended

Text of statute as originally enacted

Revised text of statute as amended

Text of the Interpretation Measure 1925 as in force today (including any amendments) within the United Kingdom, from legislation.gov.uk.

The Interpretation Measure 1925 (15 & 16 Geo. 5 No. 1) is a Church of England measure passed by the General Synod of the Church of England legislating how to interpret future Church of England measures - later it would also cover Church of England instruments.

The long title of states that it provides for the "construction of the Constitution of the National Assembly of the Church of England referred to in the Church of England Assembly (Powers) Act 1919".

The Interpretation Measure 1925 is listed in 'The Interpretation of Statutes'.

The measure also provides some the definitions in the amendment to the Treasure Act 1996 under The Treasure (Designation) (Amendment) Order 2023. The Measure is also used to interpret certain other legislation such as the Care of Cathedrals Rules 1990 and the Incumbents (Vacation of Benefices) Rules 1994.

== See also ==
- Interpretation Act
