= Acts of Parliament (Commencement) Act (Ireland) 1795 =

Act of the Parliament of Ireland

- Act of Parliament
- Parliament of Ireland
- Long title: An Act that Acts of Parliament shall commence from the Time of the Royal Assent given.
- Citation: 35 Geo. 3. c. 12 (I)
- Introduced by: Arthur Wolfe (Commons)
- Territorial extent: Ireland

Dates
- Royal assent: 24 March 1795
- Commencement: 24 March 1795 (Note: Section 1.)
- Repealed: 25 July 1973: Northern Ireland; 8 May 2007: Republic of Ireland

Other legislation
- Repealed by: Statute Law Revision (Northern Ireland) Act 1973: Northern Ireland; Statute Law Revision Act 2007: Republic of Ireland
- Relates to: Acts of Parliament (Commencement) Act 1793

Status: Repealed

Text of statute as originally enacted

The Acts of Parliament (Commencement) Act (Ireland) 1795 or the Pre-Union Irish Statutes (Commencement) Act 1795 (Note: The citation of this act by this short title is authorised for the Republic of Ireland by section 1(1) of, and Schedule 1 to the Short Titles Act 1962. The comma is omitted on the authority of section 14(3)(a) of the Interpretation Act 2005.) (35 Geo. 3. c. 12 (I)) was an act of the Parliament of Ireland which required that the clerk of the Parliaments endorse every act of Parliament passed after 8 April 1793 with the date on which the act passed and the date on which the same received royal assent and that the date is part of the act. Unless otherwise specified, acts would come into force on the date of royal assent (and not the first day of the session in which they were passed).

== Background ==
Before the passing of this act, most acts of Parliament were ex post facto laws, meaning that they were deemed to have come into force on the first day of the session in which they were passed, because of the legal fiction that a session lasted one day. This meant that all acts had come into force retroactively, some as much as a year before they were actually passed.

For this reason, and also because the House of Commons had a rule by which decisions of the whole house could not be reversed in the same session, most acts of Parliament would included a clause providing that "This Act may be amended or repealed in the present session of Parliament".

In 1793, the Acts of Parliament (Commencement) Act 1793 (33 Geo. 3. c. 13) was passed, which acknowledged in the preamble to the act this to be a "great and manifest injustice"[cite act], as individuals were bound by laws that didn't exist when they took certain actions.

== Passage ==
The bill was brought in to the House of Commons by the Attorney-General, Arthur Wolfe on 19 February 1795 and has its first reading in the House of Commons on 19 February 1795, presented by Arthur Wolfe. The bill had its second reading in the House of Commons on 20 February 1795 and was committed to a Committee of the Whole House, which met and reported on 21 February 1795, without amendments. The bill was sent to the House of Lords on 26 February 1795 and the Chief Governor on 4 March 1795.

The bill was received and referred to law officers of the Privy Council on 14 March 1795 and engrossed on 15 March 1795.

The bill was granted royal assent on 24 March 1795.

== Provisions ==
The act provided that, for all acts passed after the royal assent of the act, the Clerk of the Parliaments must endorse any act which passes with the date ("the day, month and year") on which that act passed and received royal assent. The act provided that the date must be written, in English, immediately after the title of that act, and that that endorsement is part of the endorsed act.

The act provided that such date was when the act would come into force unless the relevant act specified some other date instead of the first day of the session in which they were passed.

== Legacy ==
The act became spent when the Irish Parliament ceased to exist with the creation of the United Kingdom.

The whole act was repealed for Northern Ireland by section 1 of, and part II of the schedule to, the Statute Law Revision (Northern Ireland) Act 1973.

The whole act was repealed for the Republic of Ireland by sections 2(1) and 3(1) of, and part 1 of schedule 2 to, the Statute Law Revision Act 2007.

== See also ==
- Ex post facto law
- Coming into force
- Interpretation Act
- Statute Law Revision Act
