= Time in the United Kingdom =

Time in Europe: Light Blue / Western European Time / Greenwich Mean Time (UTC); Blue / Western European Time / Greenwich Mean Time (UTC); Blue / Western European Summer Time / British Summer Time / Irish Standard Time (UTC+1); Red / Central European Time (UTC+1); Red / Central European Summer Time (UTC+2); Yellow / Eastern European Time / Kaliningrad Time (UTC+2); Ochre / Eastern European Time (UTC+2); Ochre / Eastern European Summer Time (UTC+3); Green / Moscow Time / Turkey Time (UTC+3); Turquoise / Armenia Time / Azerbaijan Time / Georgia Time / Samara Time (UTC+4); ▉▉▉▉ Pale hues: Standard time observed all year ▉▉▉ Dark hues: Daylight saving time

The United Kingdom uses Greenwich Mean Time (GMT, UTC+00:00) (also known as Western European Time) between October and March, and British Summer Time (BST, UTC+01:00) (also known as Western European Summer Time) for the rest of the year.

BST applies from the last Sunday in March to the last Sunday in October. The time shift is intended to provide more sunlight in the evening.

== History ==
Until the advent of the railways, the United Kingdom used local mean time. Greenwich Mean Time was adopted first by the Great Western Railway in 1840 and a few others followed suit in the following years. In 1847 it was adopted by the Railway Clearing House, and by almost all railway companies by the following year. It was from this initiative that the term "railway time" was derived.

It was gradually adopted for other purposes, but the legal case of Curtis v March in 1858 held "local mean time" to be the official time. On 14 May 1880, a letter signed by 'Clerk to Justices' appeared in The Times, stating that 'Greenwich time is now kept almost throughout England, but it appears that Greenwich time is not legal time. This was changed later in 1880, when Greenwich Mean Time was legally adopted throughout the island of Great Britain under the Statutes (Definition of Time) Act 1880 (43 & 44 Vict. c. 9). GMT was adopted on the Isle of Man on 30 March 1883, Jersey in 1898, and Guernsey in 1913. Ireland adopted GMT by the Time (Ireland) Act 1916 (6 & 7 Geo. 5. c. 45), supplanting Dublin Mean Time.

Summer Time Act 1916 (Note: Section 2.)
- Act of Parliament
- Parliament of the United Kingdom
- Long title: An Act to provide for the Time in Great Britain and Ireland being in advance of Greenwich and Dublin mean time respectively in the summer months.
- Citation: 6 & 7 Geo. 5. c. 14
- Territorial extent: United Kingdom

Dates
- Royal assent: 17 May 1916
- Commencement: 17 May 1916 (Note: The Acts of Parliament (Commencement) Act 1793.)
- Repealed: 22 December 1927
Other legislation
Repealed by	Time (Ireland) Act 1916; Statute Law Revision Act 1927

Status: Repealed

Text of statute as originally enacted

Summer Time Act 1922 (Note: Section 3(2).)
- Act of Parliament
- Parliament of the United Kingdom
- Long title: An Act to provide for the time in Great Britain, Northern Ireland, the Channel Islands, and the Isle of Man being in advance of Greenwich mean time during a certain period of the year.
- Citation: 12 & 13 Geo. 5. c. 22
- Territorial extent: England and Wales; Scotland; Northern Ireland; Channel Islands; Isle of Man; (Note: Section 2.)

Dates
- Royal assent: 20 July 1922
- Commencement: 20 July 1922
- Expired: 31 December 1923 (Note: Section 3(3).)
- Repealed: 10 March 1972
Other legislation
Amended by	Summer Time Act 1925; Summer Time Act 1947
Repealed by	Summer Time Act 1972

Status: Repealed

Text of statute as originally enacted

Daylight saving time was introduced in the UK by the Summer Time Act 1916 (6 & 7 Geo. 5. c. 14), which was implemented in 1916 as GMT plus one hour and Dublin Mean Time plus one hour. The length of DST could be extended by Order in Council, and was extended for the duration of World War I. For 1916, DST extended from 21 May to 1 October, with transitions at 02:00 standard time. On 1 October 1916, Greenwich Mean Time was introduced to Ireland.

At the beginning of the 20th century, Sandringham time (UTC+00:30) was used by the royal household. This practice was abolished by King Edward VIII in an effort to reduce confusions over time.

Summer Time Act 1947 (Note: Section 4.)
- Act of Parliament
- Parliament of the United Kingdom
- Long title: An Act to amend the Summer Time Acts, 1922 and 1925.
- Citation: 10 & 11 Geo. 6. c. 16
- Territorial extent: England and Wales; Scotland; Northern Ireland; Channel Islands; Isle of Man; (Note: Section 3.)

Dates
- Royal assent: 11 March 1947
- Commencement: 11 March 1947
- Repealed: 10 March 1972
Other legislation
Amends	Summer Time Act 1922; Summer Time Act 1925
Amended by	Statute Law Revision Act 1953
Repealed by	Summer Time Act 1972

Status: Repealed

Text of statute as originally enacted

In the summers of 1941 to 1945, during the Second World War, Britain was two hours ahead of GMT and operating on British Double Summer Time (BDST). To bring this about, the clocks were not put back by an hour at the end of summer in 1940 (BST having started early, on 25 February 1940). In subsequent years, clocks continued to be advanced by one hour each spring (to BDST) and put back by an hour each autumn (to BST). On 15 July 1945, the clocks were put back by an hour, so BDST reverted to BST; the clocks were put back by an additional hour on 7 October 1945, so BST reverted to GMT for the winter of 1945.

The United Kingdom experimentally adopted Central European Time by maintaining Summer Time throughout the year from 1968 to 1971. In a House of Lords debate, Richard Butler, 17th Viscount Mountgarret said that the change was welcomed at the time, but the experiment was eventually halted after a debate in 1971, in which the outcome might have been influenced by a major accident on the morning of the debate. Proposals to adopt CET have been raised by various politicians over the years, including a proposal in 2011 to conduct an analysis of the costs and benefits.

The dates of British Summer Time are the subject of the Summer Time Act 1972. From 1972 to 1980, the day following the third Saturday in March was the start of British Summer Time (unless that day was Easter Sunday, in which case BST began a week earlier), with the day following the fourth Saturday in October being the end of British Summer Time. From 1981 to 2001, the dates were set in line with various European Directives. Since 2002 the Act has specified the last Sunday in March as the start of British Summer Time with the last Sunday in October being end of British Summer Time.

Summer Time Order 1997 (Note: Section 1(1).)
- Statutory Instrument
- Parliament of the United Kingdom
- Citation: SI 1997/2982
- Territorial extent: England and Wales; Scotland; Northern Ireland; Guernsey

Dates
- Made: 17 December 1997
- Commencement: 31 December 1997
Other legislation
Repeals/revokes	Summer Time Order 1992; Summer Time Order 1994
Made under	Summer Time Act 1972

Status: Current legislation

Text of statute as originally enacted

The Summer Time Order 1997 (SI 1997/2982) implemented the same start and end dates of summer time in the United Kingdom as in the European Union from 1998.

== Future ==
A proposal to repeal European Directive 2000/84/EC and require that member states observe their own choice of time year-round was initiated in September 2018. The United Kingdom left the EU before this reform became effective; the UK is subsequently free to make its own arrangements. As of September 2018, the UK Government had "no plans" to end daylight saving.

In July 2019, the House of Lords EU Internal Market Sub-Committee launched a new inquiry into the implications for the UK of the European changes, to "explore what preparations the Government needs to make and what factors should inform the UK's response."

== Decentralisation ==
Authority over the time zone in Northern Ireland can be legislated by the Northern Ireland Assembly but the power has never been used, as the Republic has followed the UK. In Scotland and Wales, time zone is a reserved matter, meaning that only the Parliament of the United Kingdom has power to legislate.

== IANA time zone database ==
The IANA time zone database contains one zone for the United Kingdom in the file zone.tab, named Europe/London.

This refers to the area having the ISO 3166-1 alpha-2 country code "GB". The zone names Europe/Guernsey, Europe/Isle_of_Man and Europe/Jersey exist because they have their own ISO 3166-1 alpha-2 but the zone.tab entries are links to Europe/London. There are several entries for UK possessions around the world.

Data directly from zone.tab of the IANA time zone database. Columns marked with * are the columns from zone.tab itself.

c.c.*	Coordinates*	TZ*	Comments*	UTC offset	UTC DST offset
PN	−2504−13005	Pacific/Pitcairn		−08:00	
KY	+1918−08123	America/Cayman		−05:00	
TC	+2128−07108	America/Grand_Turk		−05:00	−04:00
AI	+1812−06304	America/Anguilla		−04:00	
MS	+1643−06213	America/Montserrat		−04:00	
VG	+1827−06437	America/Tortola		−04:00	
BM	+3217−06446	Atlantic/Bermuda		−04:00	−03:00
AQ	−6734−06808	Antarctica/Rothera	Rothera	−03:00	
FK	−5142−05751	Atlantic/Stanley		−03:00	
GS	−5416−03632	Atlantic/South_Georgia		−02:00	
SH	−1555−00542	Atlantic/St_Helena		+00:00	
GB	+513030−0000731	Europe/London		+00:00	+01:00
GG	+492717−0023210	Europe/Guernsey		+00:00	+01:00
IM	+5409−00428	Europe/Isle_of_Man		+00:00	+01:00
JE	+491101−0020624	Europe/Jersey		+00:00	+01:00
GI	+3608−00521	Europe/Gibraltar		+01:00	+02:00
IO	−0720+07225	Indian/Chagos		+06:00	

== British territories ==
Standard time	Summer time (DST)	Area
UTC−08:00		Pitcairn Islands
UTC−05:00		Cayman Islands
UTC−05:00 (EST)	UTC−04:00	Turks and Caicos Islands
UTC−04:00 (AST, DST never observed)		Anguilla, British Virgin Islands, Montserrat
UTC−04:00 (AST)	UTC−03:00	Bermuda
UTC−03:00 (FKST)		Falkland Islands, British Antarctic Territory
UTC−02:00		South Georgia and the South Sandwich Islands
UTC (GMT, DST never observed)		Saint Helena, Ascension and Tristan da Cunha
UTC (GMT)	UTC+01:00	United Kingdom (England, Northern Ireland, Scotland, and Wales), Guernsey, Isle of Man, Jersey
UTC+01:00 (CET)	UTC+02:00	Gibraltar
UTC+02:00 (EET)	UTC+03:00	Akrotiri and Dhekelia
UTC+06:00		British Indian Ocean Territory

== See also ==
- Lists of time zones
- Summer time in Europe
