= Acts Interpretation Act 1901 =

Australian legislation

Parliament of Australia
- Long title: An Act for the Interpretation of Acts of Parliament and for Shortening their Language
- Citation: No. 2 of 1901 or No. 2, 1901 as amended
- Territorial extent: States and territories of Australia
- Royal assent: 12 July 1901
- Commenced: 12 July 1901
- Status: Amended

The Acts Interpretation Act 1901 (Cth) is an Interpretation Act of the Parliament of Australia which establishes rules for the interpretation of Australian acts and other legislation. The act applies only to Commonwealth legislation, with each state and the self-governing territory having its own legislation.

== The act ==
The act sets out rules for the commencement (Part II), repeal and expiration (Part III) of Commonwealth acts; general provisions (Part IV) including what material may be considered when interpreting an act (Part V); the meaning of words and expression commonly used in legislation (Part VI) and judicial expressions in legal proceedings (Part VII); the measurement and expression of distance and time (Part VIII); how legislation may be cited (Part IX); and provides rules about the interpretation of legislative instruments (secondary legislation) and resolutions of the Parliament (Part XI).

== Analysis ==
The act was the second of the 1st Parliament in its first session and "the first substantive Commonwealth act to be enacted.".

When introduced in 1901, the act was modelled on and adopted many of the rules set out in the Interpretation Act 1889 (Imp) and also adopted "some of the special provisions of the New South Wales Interpretation Act of 1897". In some cases, the rules of the Imperial Parliament at Westminster were preferred: for example, the New South Wales statute provided that distance be measured according to the nearest route ordinarily used, but the Commonwealth adopted the Imperial provision of a straight line on a horizontal plane. In other cases, it preferred the colonial New South Wales rules: for example, the financial year was made to end on 30 June, not, as in England and Wales, on 31 March. Some rules did not mandate a uniform national standard but made allowances for local variations: for example, references to time were to be read so that "such time shall, unless it is otherwise specifically stated, be deemed in each State or part of the Commonwealth to mean the standard or legal time in that State or part".

=== Common Law ===
When first enacted, the act codified the Common Law in some cases. For example, there is a presumption at Common Law that parliament intends its legislation to operate only on persons and matters within its territory. The act repeated that presumption at section 21(1)(b): if an act was silent on the question, then the provision operated to confine the act in its territorial reach. However, parliament may override the presumption and the section to give extraterritorial operation to the enactment by express words or "necessary implication".

In other cases, the act reversed the Common Law. For example, there was a Common Law rule that, when interpreting statutes, courts could not consider "extrinsic material" such as a minister's second reading speech made when the statute was before parliament. The Act, by s.15AB reversed this rule, giving courts access to a wide range of material which would otherwise have been excluded.

Where there are conflicting Common Law rules, the act sometimes gives preference to one approach. For example, there is sometimes seen to be a conflict between a "literal" and "purposive" reading of statutes; by s. 15AA, the Act mandates a purposive approach. The use of a purposive approach was affirmed in Australia in Bropho v Western Australia (1990).

== See also ==
- Interpretation Act
