= Interpretation Act (Northern Ireland) 1954 =

Act of the Parliament of Northern Ireland

Interpretation Act (Northern Ireland) 1954 (Note: Section 51.)
- Act of Parliament
- Parliament of Northern Ireland
- Long title: An Act to make provision with respect to the operation, interpretation and citation of Acts of the Parliament of Northern Ireland and of instruments made thereunder.
- Citation: 1954 c. 33 (N.I.)
- Territorial extent: Northern Ireland

Dates
- Royal assent: 21 December 1954
Other legislation
Amended by	Criminal Appeal (Northern Ireland) Act 1968; Administration of Justice Act 1977; Judicature (Northern Ireland) Act 1978; Elected Authorities (Northern Ireland) Act 1989
Relates to	Interpretation Act 1978

Status: Amended

Revised text of statute as amended

Text of the Interpretation Act (Northern Ireland) 1954 as in force today (including any amendments) within the United Kingdom, from legislation.gov.uk.

The Interpretation Act (Northern Ireland) 1954 (c. 33 (N.I.)) is an act of the Parliament of Northern Ireland. The act makes provision for the interpretation of acts of the Parliament of Northern Ireland. The act is known as a "Interpretation Act".

The Interpretation Act (Northern Ireland) 1954 binds the Crown.

Originally the act did not apply to delegated legislation, but this was changed by the Statutory Rules Act (Northern Ireland) 1958, which amended the act to apply to all secondary legislation.

Even during direct rule in Northern Ireland, the Interpretation Act continued to apply to Orders in Council for Northern Ireland

== Provisions ==
The act requires any binding of the royal prerogative can only occur if it is explicitly named. The act clarifies that references to the Crown refer to the Sovereign. Amendments to the act describe how to interpret legislation relating to the EU, legislation passed by the Parliament of the United Kingdom and legislation passed in Stormont. The Act describes how to interpret enactments.

The act describes how to interpret an offence involving two or more statutory provisions, and regulates how courts interpret legislation. The act explains how to interpret legislation relating to the servicing of documents.

The act requires that interpretation of "oath" and "affidavit" to include affirmations and declarations, and that "swear" includes "affirm" and "declare".

The act describes how legislation is to be published by the Queen's Printer and the duties of the Presiding Officer in this process.

The act describes how usage of genderedness of pronouns must be ignored and that the status of a word as plural or singular must be ignored.

The act sets out the statutory period for consideration of statutory rules.

== Other uses of the act ==
Definitions of the act are used to define Areas of Special Scientific Interest

== See also ==
- Interpretation Act
