= Interpretation Act 1850 =

Act of the Parliament of the United Kingdom

- Act of Parliament
- Parliament of the United Kingdom
- Long title: An Act for shortening the Language used in Acts of Parliament.
- Citation: 13 & 14 Vict. c. 21
- Introduced by: Henry Brougham, 1st Baron Brougham and Vaux (Lords)
- Territorial extent: United Kingdom

Dates
- Royal assent: 10 June 1850
- Commencement: 4 February 1851 (Note: Section 8.)
- Repealed: 1 January 1890
Other legislation
Repealed by	Interpretation Act 1889
Relates to	Acts of Parliament (Commencement) Act 1793; Statutes (Definition of Time) Act 1880; Interpretation Act 1978

Status: Repealed

Text of statute as originally enacted

The Interpretation Act 1850 (13 & 14 Vict. c. 21), also known as Lord Brougham's Act, was an act of the Parliament of the United Kingdom that simplified the language that was used in statutes.

The act devised the current system of dividing legislation into sections which are automatically substantive enactments, and also made various other provisions for interpreting other statutes. For example, it stated that the masculine includes the feminine (thus enabling "he" to be written instead of "he or she"), unless expressly indicated otherwise.

== Background ==
In the United Kingdom, acts of Parliament remain in force until expressly repealed. Blackstone's Commentaries on the Laws of England, published in the late 18th-century, raised questions about the system and structure of the common law and the poor drafting and disorder of the existing statute book.

In 1806, the Commission on Public Records passed a resolution requesting the production of a report on the best mode of reducing the volume of the statute book. From 1810 to 1825, The Statutes of the Realm was published, providing for the first time the authoritative collection of acts. In 1816, both Houses of Parliament, passed resolutions that an eminent lawyer with 20 clerks be commissioned to make a digest of the statutes, which was declared "very expedient to be done." However, this was never done.

Several aspects of the statute law had become necessary to clarify.

== Passage ==
The Acts of Parliament Abbreviation Bill had its first reading in the House of Lords on 12 February 1850, presented by Henry Brougham, 1st Baron Brougham and Vaux. The bill had its second reading in the House of Lords on 18 February 1850 and was committed to a Committee of the Whole House, which met and reported on 21 February 1850, without amendments. The bill was considered by the House of Lords on 21 February 1850, with amendments. The amended bill had its third reading in the House of Lords on 22 February 1850 and passed, without amendments.

The bill had its first reading in the House of Commons on 13 May 1850. The bill had its second reading in the House of Commons on 18 May 1850 and was committed to a Committee of the Whole House, which met and reported on 27 May 1850, without amendments. The bill had its third reading in the House of Commons on 1 June 1850 and passed, with amendments.

The amended bill was considered and agreed to by the House of Lords on 3 June 1850.

The bill was granted royal assent on 10 June 1850.

== Provisions ==
=== Section 1 ===
Be it declared and enacted [...], That every Act to be passed after the Commencement of this Act may be altered, amended, or repealed in the same Session of Parliament, any Law or Usage to the contrary notwithstanding. [preamble to the Act omitted]

Most acts of parliament had included a clause providing that "This Act may be amended or repealed in the present session of Parliament". This was thought to be necessary because all acts of a session were considered to have retrospectively passed simultaneously on the first day of that session until 1793, and the House of Commons had a rule by which decisions of the whole house could not be reversed in the same session.

=== Section 2 ===
Be it enacted, That all Acts shall be divided into Sections, if there be more Enactments than One, which Sections shall be deemed to be substantive Enactments, without any introductory Words.

Many acts of parliament, including this act, would prefix each section with a clause such as "And be it further enacted", "provided always" or "Provided always and it be enacted".

=== Section 3 ===
Section 3 of the act provided that where an act is referred to it shall be sufficient to cite the year of the reign, chapter and section (and in the case of acts from the reign of Henry VII and earlier, also possibly the session or statute), in reference to copies of the statutes by the Queen's Printer and the reports of the Commissioners of Public Records. Previously an act would be cited as, for example, "an Act passed in the Ninth Year of the Reign of King George the Fourth, intituled An Act to consolidate and amend the Laws relating to Savings Banks". The title (today referred to as the long title, in contrast to the short titles that started to be introduced in the 1840s) would often be very long.

=== Section 4 ===
Section 4 of the act provided that:

- Words importing the masculine gender be deemed and taken to include females, unless expressly provided.
- The singular be deemed to include the plural and the plural to include the singular, unless expressly provided.
- "Month" to mean "Calendar Month", unless words were added indicating lunar month.
- "County" to mean also "County of a Town or of a City", unless otherwise expressed.
- "Land" to include "Messuages, Tenements and Hereditaments, Houses and Buildings, of any Tenure", unless there are words to exclude houses and buildings or to restrict the meaning to tenements of some particular tenure.
- "Oath", "swear" and "affidavit" to include "Affirmation, Declaration, affirming, and declaring, in the Case of Persons by Law allowed to declare or affirm instead of swearing".

=== Section 5 ===
Be it enacted, That where any Act repealing in whole or in part any former Act is itself repealed, such last Repeal shall not revive the Act or Provisions before repealed, unless Words be added reviving such Act or Provisions.

Under common law, once an act was repealed it was treated as if it had never been passed, with the exception of acts past and closed.

=== Section 6 ===
Section 6 of the act provided that whenever any act repealed in whole or part any former act by substituting provision(s), such provision(s) remain in force until the substituted provision(s) come into operation by force of the last made act. This was designed to save words in commencement sections.

=== Section 7 ===
Section 7 of the act provided that every act is a public act to be judicially noticed as such, unless the contrary is expressly provided by the act.

=== Section 8 ===
Section 8 of the act provided that the act would take effect from and immediately after the commencement of the next session of parliament.

== Subsequent developments ==
The act was extended to former colonies, including New Zealand.

In 1867, an amendment was debated and defeated to address concerns that the act could be used to make "man" apply to women in the Representation of the People Act 1867 (30 & 31 Vict. c. 102). In the test case Chorlton v. Lings (1868) L.R. 4 C.P. 374, encouraged by campaigner Lilly Maxwell, barristers Richard Pankhurst and John Coleridge unsuccessfully argued that as the 1867 act used the ambiguous term "man" instead of "male persons", as the Representation of the People Act 1832 (2 & 3 Will. 4 c. 45) had done, women could vote in British elections.

In 1880, the Statutes (Definition of Time) Act 1880 (43 & 44 Vict. c. 9) legally adopted Greenwich Mean Time throughout the island of Great Britain and Dublin Mean Time throughout Ireland.

The whole act was repealed by section 41 of, and the schedule to, the Interpretation Act 1889 (52 & 53 Vict. c. 63), which came into force on 1 January 1890.

The 1889 act has since been superseded by other Interpretation Acts, including the current Interpretation Act 1978.

== See also ==
- Interpretation Act
- Statute Law Revision Act
