= Frigaliment Importing Co Ltd v BNS International Sales Corp =

1960 U.S. District Court for the Southern District of New York case

Frigaliment Importing Co Ltd v BNS International Sales Corp 190 F.Supp. 116 (1960), is a U.S. District Court for the Southern District of New York case that was ruled on December 27, 1960. Frigaliment argued that there was a breach of contract since B.N.S. Int'l Sales Corp (B.N.S.) was providing the wrong type of chickens. The court ruled in favor of B.N.S. since the contract language was too broad in what defined a chicken.

The argument over the definition of a chicken led to a contract dispute between Frigaliment Importing Co. (the buyer) and B.N.S. Int'l Sales Corp (the seller). Both parties could not agree on the definition of chicken, Frigaliment arguing that they were not providing the right type of chicken since they interpreted chickens as young and suitable for broiling/frying. B.N.S., on the other hand, argued that language that was used in the contract included all types of chicken and not exclusively young that were suitable for broiling/frying. In other words, B.N.S argued that the contract language was too broad, therefore the definition of a chicken would also be broad. In the end, the court ruled in favor of B.N.S., since Frigaliment had failed to specify the specific definition of "chicken" it intended and therefore, there was no breach of contract.

== History of the case ==
The two parties involved in the case were the plaintiff, a Swiss corporation known as Frigaliment Importing Co. and the defendant, a New York Company known as B.N.S. International Sales Corp. Initial negotiations began between the two in early 1957 with Frigaliment Importing Co. wanting to purchase 25,000 pounds of chicken. After a few weeks of deliberation, on May 2, 1957, two contracts were signed and agreed upon for the sale of "US Fresh Frozen Chicken, Grade A, Government Inspected." The initial contract was scheduled for May 10, 1957 for a grand total of 100,000 pounds of chicken. The second contract, which was also dated May 2, with shipment scheduled for May 30, 1957, for a grand total of 75,000 pounds of chicken. What is important to note is that both contracts included different weight class specifications: 2½-3 pounds and 1½-2 pounds.

On May 28, 1957, Frigaliment received the first shipment but discovered that the heavier 2½-3 pounds birds were not young chickens suitable for frying and broiling. The plaintiff notified B.N.S. International Sales Corp of its concerns before the second shipment arrived. Once the second shipment arrived on May 29, Frigaliment did not receive the type of chickens it wanted which led to the dispute going into the courts when Frigaliment filed suit against B.N.S. International Sales Corp for a breach of goods that did not fit the contract descriptions.

On December 27, 1960, Judge Henry J. Friendly of the United States District Court for the Southern District of New York ruled in favor of B.N.S. International Sales Corp. since the plaintiff failed to meet the burden of proof, more specifically the definition of chicken that it wanted.

== Argument ==
Frigaliment argued that it deemed the chicken in the contract agreed upon as "young" and "suitable for broiling and frying". It backed its argument with evidence that in the chicken trade, chicken was typically understood to mean young chicken. Therefore, it believed that a breach of contract was committed by B.N.S since it only provided older chicken.

B.N.S argued that the word chicken had a broad definition which was not specified in the contract. The only specifications presented in the contract were the two weight classes. It argued that chicken was considered a general term while more specific terms like "broiler" or "fryer" should have been needed if that was what the buyer desired. It cited Frigaliment's own representatives' statement of wanting "any kind of chickens". B.N.S also argued that the price agreed upon was considered low for the type of chicken that Frigaliment wanted and was rather consistent with older chickens that they were sending.

== Court ruling ==
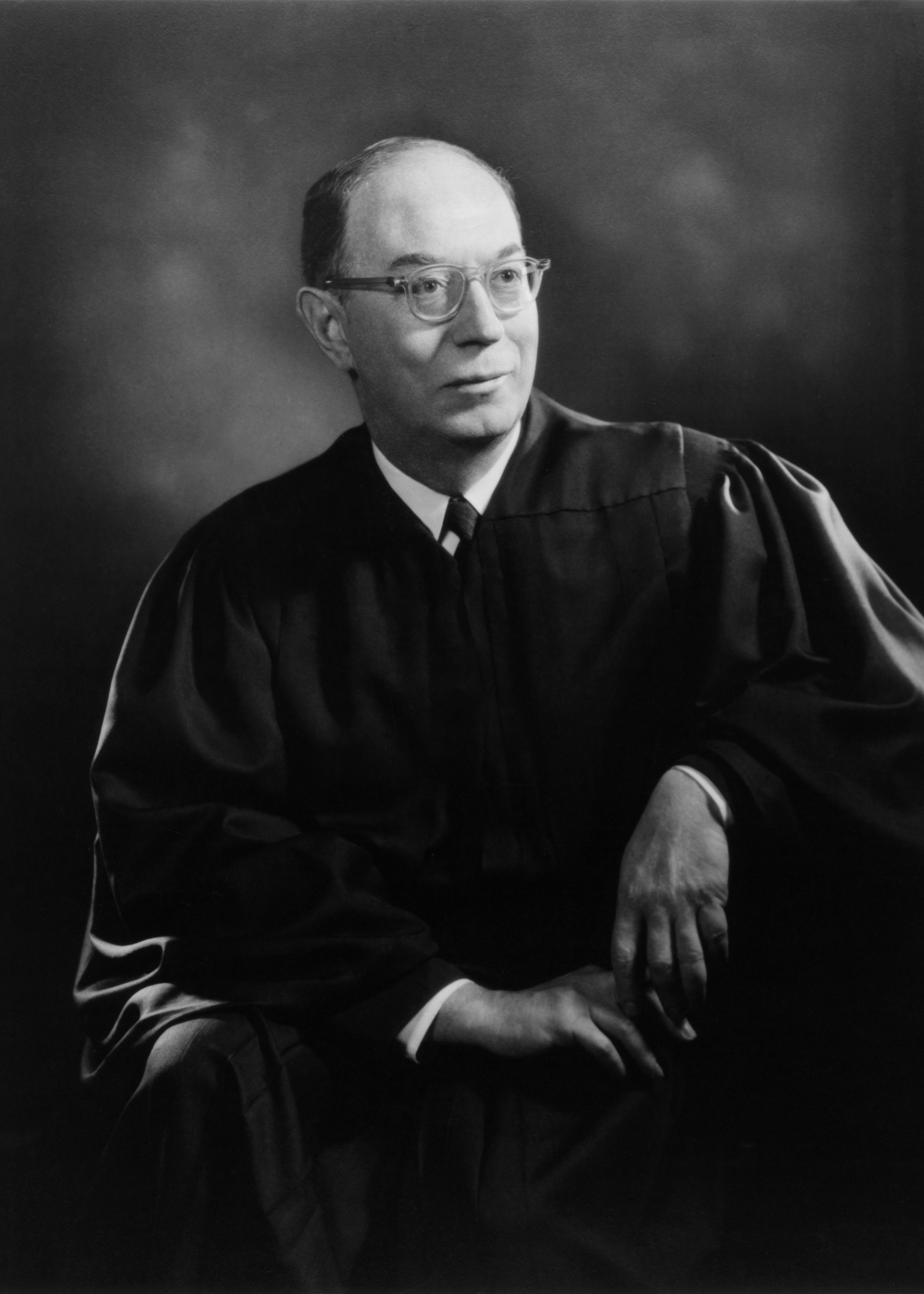
Judge Henry J. Friendly authored the majority opinion of the Court.

On December 27, 1960 Judge Henry J. Friendly ruled on behalf of the United States District Court for the Southern District of New York in favor of the defendant, B.N.S. International Sales Corp. The ruling was based on the principle of burden of proof, a principle the plaintiff, Frigaliment Importing Co. failed to accomplish. Frigaliment needed to provide proof that the contract term "chicken" had the exact definition it claimed which was young chickens that were suitable for frying/broiling. The court found the word "chicken" to be ambiguous, as it has various valid meanings and definition in both the generic everyday language and the chicken trade. Since the contract itself did not clearly clarify the term, the court had to resort to using outside evidence and arguments such as witness testimonies from both industry members and individuals from both parties in order to determine both parties' meanings. In the end, the court ruled that Frigaliment failed to provide a burden of proof since its argument of its definition of chicken was the intended and defined definition that was stated and agreed in the contracts.

== Significance ==
Frigaliment Importing Co. v. B.N.S. Int'l Sales Corp is an example of how courts interpret and rule on ambiguous contract terms. It is an example of contract interpretation when a term is ambiguous. This case highlights the idea that a word can have various valid meanings. If a contract was created and agreed upon but it does not clearly define the term, then a court is forced to look and analyze beyond the written document to understand the parties' intent. This case illustrates that courts do not choose one meaning and/or intent over another but the courts analyze all disposable evidence to reach the conclusion on the most reasonable interpretation. This was a landmark case since it set the precedent of avoiding using ambiguous terms in contract in order to best avoid burden of proof.

This case set a precedent that can be seen and demonstrated in similar cases. For example, Cerveceria Modelo De Mexico v. CB Brand Strategies, LLC. was a case that essentially shared the same argument of Frigaliment Importing Co. v. B.N.S. Int'l Sales Corp., a dispute around what is the correct definition of an ambiguous term, more specifically, the term of beer. Frigaliment Importing Co. v. B.N.S. Int'l Sales Corp. was used as precedent in the case and was ruled in 2023.
