= Acts of Parliament (Commencement) Act 1793 =

Act of the Parliament of Great Britain

Acts of Parliament (Commencement) Act 1793 (Note: The citation of this act by this short title was authorised by section 1 of, and the first schedule to, the Short Titles Act 1896. Due to the repeal of those provisions it is now authorised by section 19(2) of the Interpretation Act 1978.)
- Act of Parliament
- Parliament of Great Britain
- Long title: An Act to prevent Acts of Parliament from taking effect from a Time prior to the passing thereof.
- Citation: 33 Geo. 3. c. 13
- Territorial extent: England and Wales; Scotland

Dates
- Royal assent: 8 April 1793
- Commencement: 8 April 1793 (Note: Section 1.)
Other legislation
Amended by	Interpretation Act 1978
Relates to	Acts of Parliament (Commencement) Act (Ireland) 1795; Interpretation Act 1850; Interpretation Act 1978

Status: Amended

Text of statute as originally enacted

Revised text of statute as amended

Text of the Acts of Parliament (Commencement) Act 1793 as in force today (including any amendments) within the United Kingdom, from legislation.gov.uk.

The Acts of Parliament (Commencement) Act 1793 (33 Geo. 3. c. 13) is an act of the Parliament of Great Britain that requires that the clerk of the Parliaments endorse every act of Parliament passed after 8 April 1793 with the date on which the act passed and the date on which the same received royal assent and that the date is part of the act. Unless otherwise specified, acts would come into force on the date of royal assent. Previous practice had been to date the acts (and, thus retrospectively, their application) as the first day of the session in which they were passed.

The Interpretation Act 1978 repealed the commencement part of the act, restating those provisions in section 4 and additionally clarifying that an Act comes into force at the beginning of the specified day.

== Background ==
Before the enactment of this act, most acts of Parliament were ex post facto laws, meaning that they were deemed to have come into force on the first day of the session in which they were passed, because of the legal fiction that a session lasted one day. This meant that all acts had come into force retroactively, some as much as a year before they were actually passed. This was acknowledged in the preamble to the act to be a "great and manifest injustice", as individuals were bound by laws that did not exist when they took certain actions.

Due to this convention, and also because the House of Commons had a rule by which decisions of the whole house could not be reversed in the same session, most acts of Parliament would include a clause providing that "This Act may be amended or repealed in the present session of Parliament".

== Provisions ==
The act provided that, for all acts passed after 8 April 1793, the Clerk of the Parliaments must endorse any act which passes with the date ("the day, month and year") on which that act passed and received royal assent. The act provided that the date must be written, in English, immediately after the title of that act, and that that endorsement is part of the endorsed act.

The act provided that such date was when the act would come into force unless the relevant act specified some other date instead of the first day of the session in which they were passed.

== Legacy ==
=== Subsequent developments ===
In 1795, the Acts of Parliament (Commencement) Act (Ireland) 1795 (35 Geo. 3. c. 12 (I)) was passed by the Parliament of Ireland, which provided the same for acts of the Parliament of Ireland.

In 1850, the Interpretation Act 1850 (13 & 14 Vict. c. 21) was passed, which simplified the language that was used in statutes. Section 1 of that act provided that acts of Parliament may be altered, amended or repealed in the same session of parliament.

In 1889, the Interpretation Act 1889 (52 & 53 Vict. c. 63) was passed, which further consolidated enactments relating to statutory construction.

In 1978, the Interpretation Act 1978 was passed. Section 4 of that act provided for the same, and the relevant words of the act were repealed by section 25(1) and schedule 3 to that act, effective 1 January 1979 (Note: Section 26.).

=== Dating of acts ===
Because of the fiction that an act had come into force on the first day of the session, it was also the convention in citing a pre-1793 act to date it to the year in which the session had commenced. In the context of modern historical writing, however, it is more usual to date acts (especially well-known and historically significant acts) to the actual year in which they passed through Parliament. This leads to discrepancies in the way in which the same act may be cited or referred to, for example:

- The Act of Uniformity (1 Eliz. 1 c. 2) is often dated to 1558 in legal contexts, but to 1559 in historical contexts.
- The Toleration Act (1 Will. & Mar. c. 18) and the Bill of Rights (1 Will. & Mar. Sess. 2 c. 2) to 1688 in legal contexts, but 1689 in historical contexts.
- The Union with Scotland Act (6 Ann. c. 11) (Note: This is the citation in The Statutes of the Realm.) to 1706 in legal contexts, but 1707 in historical contexts.
- The Calendar (New Style) Act 1750 (24 Geo. 2 c. 23, received royal assent 17 May 1751) is known in US usage as the British "Calendar Act of 1751", which may cause some confusion since there was also a Calendar Act 1751 (25 Geo. 2. c. 30) to amend the 1750 act, which received royal assent on 26 March 1752.

Before the Calendar (New Style) Act 1750 came into force, the start of the year in English legal usage was 25 March, rather than 1 January. Some differences in year only arise because of this oddity; for example, the Bill of Rights commenced on 13 February 1688 according to the English version of the Julian calendar, which is 23 February 1689 according to the Gregorian calendar. Similarly, because Scotland had changed its (also Julian) calendar in 1600 so that its year began on 1 January, the English Union with Scotland Act 1706 was actually passed shortly after the Scottish Union with England Act 1707 – in the same March of the same year in modern reckoning.

== See also ==
- Ex post facto law
- Coming into force
- Interpretation Act
- Old Style and New Style dates
- Statute Law Revision Act
