= Statutory term analysis =

Legal process

Statutory term analysis is a method of analyzing a statutory term in a law to ensure that it is Congress, not a judge, who has the power to make laws under Article I, section 8, clause 18 of the U.S. Constitution (the Necessary and Proper Clause). The Statutory Term Analysis (STA) method includes using only the text of the United States Congressional Record as evidence of the legal meaning of a term in a federal statute and provides new detailed federal rules of evidence to a judge on how the judge (or judges) is to consider the timing, weight, and order of analysis of that evidence in the court-issued opinion.
