= Summer Time Act 1972 =

Act of the Parliament of the United Kingdom

Summer Time Act 1972 (Note: Section 6(1).)
- Act of Parliament
- Parliament of the United Kingdom
- Long title: An Act to consolidate the enactments relating to summer time.
- Citation: 1972 c. 6
- Territorial extent: United Kingdom

Dates
- Royal assent: 10 February 1972
- Commencement: 10 March 1972 (Note: Section 6(2).)

Other legislation
- Amends: See § Repealed enactments
- Repeals/revokes: See § Repealed enactments
- Amended by: Northern Ireland Constitution Act 1973; Summer Time Order 2002
- Relates to: Summer Time Act 1922; Summer Time Act 1925; Summer Time Act 1947; British Standard Time Act 1968

Status: Amended

Text of statute as originally enacted

Revised text of statute as amended

Text of the Summer Time Act 1972 as in force today (including any amendments) within the United Kingdom, from legislation.gov.uk.

The Summer Time Act 1972 (c. 6) is an act of the Parliament of the United Kingdom that consolidated enactments relating to summer time in the United Kingdom.

== Provisions ==
=== Repealed enactments ===
Section 6(3) of the act repealed 4 enactments, listed in that section.

Enactments repealed by section 6(3)
Citation	Short title	Extent of repeal
12 & 13 Geo. 5. c. 22	Summer Time Act 1922	The whole act.
15 & 16 Geo. 5. c. 64	Summer Time Act 1925	The whole act.
10 & 11 Geo. 6. c. 16	Summer Time Act 1947	The whole act.
1968 c. 45	British Standard Time Act 1968	The whole act.

== Subsequent developments ==
The act was amended by the Summer Time Order 2002 (SI 2002/262), which came into force on 11 March 2002. The order substituted section 1(2) to specify the period of summer time as the period beginning at one o'clock, Greenwich mean time, on the last Sunday in March and ending at one o'clock, Greenwich mean time, on the last Sunday in October. The order also omitted section 2 of the act, which had empowered Her Majesty by Order in Council to vary the period of summer time or to provide for double summer time. These amendments implemented Directive 2000/84/EC of the European Parliament and of the Council on summer-time arrangements.
