= Interpretation Act =

Stock short title used for legislation

Interpretation Act (with its variations) is a stock short title used for legislation in Australia, Canada, Hong Kong, Malaysia, New Zealand, the Republic of Ireland, Singapore and the United Kingdom relating to interpretation of legislation. The bill for an act with this short title will have been known as the Interpretation Bill during its passage through Parliament.

Interpretation Acts may be a generic name either for legislation bearing that short title or for all legislation which relates to interpretation.

== List ==
=== Australia ===
Commonwealth

- The Acts Interpretation Act 1901

States and territories

- Interpretation Act 1967 (ACT)
- Legislation Act 2001 (ACT)
- Interpretation Act 1987 (NSW)
- Interpretation Act 1978 (NT)
- Acts Interpretation Act 1954 (Qld)
- The Acts Interpretation Act 1931 (Tas.)
- Interpretation of Legislation Act 1984 (Vic.)
- Interpretation Act 1984 (WA)

=== Canada ===
Federal

- Interpretation Act, RSC 1985, c I-21

Provinces and territories

- Interpretation Act, RSA 2000, c I-8
- Interpretation Act, RSBC 1986 c I-238
- The Interpretation Act, CCSM, c I80
- Interpretation Act, RSNB 1973, c I-13
- Interpretation Act, RSNL 1990, c I-19
- Interpretation Act, SNWT 2017, c 19
- Interpretation Act, RSNS 1989, c 235
- Interpretation Act, RSPEI 1988, c I-8.1
- Interpretation Act, CQLR c I-16
- Interpretation Act, RSY 2002, c 125

=== Hong Kong ===
- The Interpretation and General Clauses and Ordinance 1966

=== Republic of Ireland and Irish Free State ===
- The Interpretation Act 1923
- The Interpretation Act 1937
- The Interpretation (Amendment) Act 1993
- The Interpretation (Amendment) Act 1997
- The Interpretation Act 2005

=== Malaysia ===
- The Interpretation Acts 1948 and 1967

=== New Zealand ===
- The Legislation Act 2019 (No 58)

=== Singapore ===
- Interpretation Act (Cap. 1)

=== United Kingdom ===
- The Interpretation Act 1889 (52 & 53 Vict. c. 63)
- The Laying of Documents Before Parliament (Interpretation) Act 1948 (11 & 12 Geo. 6. c. 59)
- The Interpretation Act 1978 (c. 30)

Lord Brougham's Act, known as the Interpretation Act 1850 (13 & 14 Vict. c. 21), has been described as an interpretation act.

Act of the Scottish Parliament

- The Interpretation and Legislative Reform (Scotland) Act 2010 (asp 10)

Act of Senedd Cymru

- The Legislation (Wales) Act 2019 (anaw 4)
- The Legislation (Procedure, Publication and Repeals) (Wales) Act 2025 (asc 3)

Act of the Parliament of Northern Ireland

- The Interpretation Act (Northern Ireland) 1954 (c. 33 (N.I.))

Measure of the Church Assembly

- The Interpretation Measure 1925 (15 and 16 Geo. 5. No. 1)

Crown Dependencies

- Guernsey: The Interpretation (Bailiwick of Guernsey) Law, 2016; Interpretation (Guernsey) Law, 1948
- Isle of Man: The Interpretation Act 2015
- Jersey: The Interpretation (Jersey) Law 1954

== See also ==
- List of short titles
