= Interpretation Act 1978 =

Act of the Parliament of the United Kingdom

Interpretation Act 1978 (Note: Section 27.)
- Act of Parliament
- Parliament of the United Kingdom
- Long title: An Act to consolidate the Interpretation Act 1889 and certain other enactments relating to the construction and operation of Acts of Parliament and other instruments, with amendments to give effect to recommendations of the Law Commission and the Scottish Law Commission.
- Citation: 1978 c. 30
- Territorial extent: United Kingdom

Dates
- Royal assent: 20 July 1978
- Commencement: 1 January 1979 (Note: Section 26.)

Other legislation
- Amends: Places of Worship Registration Act 1855; Foreign Jurisdiction Act 1890; Royal and Parliamentary Titles Act 1927; Interpretation Measure 1925; Ghana Independence Act 1957; Bail Act 1976
- Repeals/revokes: Wales and Berwick Act 1746; Statutes (Definition of Time) Act 1880
- Amended by: Magistrates' Courts Act 1980; British Nationality Act 1981; Building Act 1984; County Courts Act 1984; Family Law Reform Act 1987; Finance Act 1987; Criminal Justice Act 1988; Children Act 1989; Water Act 1989; Local Government (Wales) Act 1994; Health Authorities Act 1995; Police Act 1996; Trusts of Land and Appointment of Trustees Act 1996; Scotland Act 1998; Police (Northern Ireland) Act 2000; British Overseas Territories Act 2002; Justice (Northern Ireland) Act 2002; Criminal Justice Act 2003; Income Tax (Earnings and Pensions) Act 2003; Civil Partnership Act 2004; Commissioners for Revenue and Customs Act 2005; Constitutional Reform Act 2005; Immigration, Asylum and Nationality Act 2006; Legislative and Regulatory Reform Act 2006; Government of Wales Act 2006; Local Government and Public Involvement in Health Act 2007; Offender Management Act 2007; UK Borders Act 2007; European Union (Amendment) Act 2008; Housing and Regeneration Act 2008; Budget Responsibility and National Audit Act 2011; Police Reform and Social Responsibility Act 2011; Charities Act 2011; Crime and Courts Act 2013; Enterprise and Regulatory Reform Act 2013; Infrastructure Act 2015; Justice Act (Northern Ireland) 2015; European Union (Withdrawal) Act 2018; Legislation (Wales) Act 2019; European Union (Withdrawal Agreement) Act 2020; Fisheries Act 2020; Sentencing Act 2020; Judicial Review and Courts Act 2022; Retained EU Law (Revocation and Reform) Act 2023

Status: Amended

Text of statute as originally enacted

Revised text of statute as amended

Text of the Interpretation Act 1978 as in force today (including any amendments) within the United Kingdom, from legislation.gov.uk.

The Interpretation Act 1978 (c. 30) is an act of the Parliament of the United Kingdom. The act makes provision for the interpretation of acts of Parliament, Measures of the General Synod of the Church of England, Measures of the Church Assembly, subordinate legislation, "deeds and other instruments and documents", acts of the Scottish Parliament and instruments made thereunder (added 1998), and Measures and acts of the National Assembly for Wales and instruments made thereunder. The act makes provision in relation to: the construction of certain words and phrases, words of enactment, amendment or repeal of Acts in the Session they were passed, judicial notice, commencement, statutory powers and duties, the effect of repeals, and duplicated offences.

The Interpretation Act (Northern Ireland) 1954 applies in the same way to Acts of the Parliament of Northern Ireland or Acts of the Northern Ireland Assembly.

== Provisions ==
=== Section 7 ===
Section 7 of the act, concerned with service of documents by post, replaced section 26 of the Interpretation Act 1889 (52 & 53 Vict. c. 63). It states that

Where an Act authorises or requires any document to be served by post (whether the expression "serve" or the expression "give" or "send" or any other expression is used) then, unless the contrary intention appears, the service is deemed to be effected by properly addressing, pre-paying and posting a letter containing the document and, unless the contrary is proved, to have been effected at the time at which the letter would be delivered in the ordinary course of post.

Interpretation of the words unless the contrary is proved is discussed in the case of Calladine-Smith v Saveorder Ltd, as to whether the "contrary" means the contrary of the allegation that the letter was properly addressed, prepaid and posted, or whether it refers to the contrary of the deeming provision that the letter in question was delivered in the ordinary course of post. In this particular case, a letter was shown to have been properly addressed, pre-paid and posted, but not received. On a balance of probabilities the court accepted that the "contrary" to the deemed provision had been proved, the letter was not received, and therefore the deemed provision could not hold.

=== Section 16 – General savings ===
The following cases are relevant to this section:

- Hough v Windus (1884) 12 QBD 224, CA
- R v Fisher (Charles) [1969] 1 WLR 8, CA
- R v West London Stipendiary Magistrate, ex parte Simeon [1983] AC 234, HL

=== Section 18 – Duplicated offences ===
Section 18 of the act provides:

Where an act or omission constitutes an offence under two or more Acts, or both under an Act and at common law, the offender shall, unless the contrary intention appears, be liable to be prosecuted and punished under either or any of those Acts or at common law, but shall not be liable to be punished more than once for the same offence.

This section replaces section 33 of the Interpretation Act 1889 (52 & 53 Vict. c. 63). Humphreys J. said that that section did not add anything to the common law, or detract anything from it.

==== "... shall not be liable to be punished more than once for the same offence" ====
The words "same offence" at the end of section 18 of the act do not mean "same act" or "same cause". A person may be punished more than once for the same act. Two prosecutions for a single false statement in a brochure is not oppressive.

See also Williams v Hallam (1943) 112 LJKB 353, (1943) 59 TLR 287, (1943) 41 LGR 165.

=== Repealed enactments ===
Section 25(1) of the act repealed 53 enactments, listed in schedule 3 to the act.

Citation	Short title	Extent of repeal
20 Geo. 2. c. 42	Wales and Berwick Act 1746	The whole act.
33 Geo. 3. c. 13	Acts of Parliament (Commencement) Act 1793	The words from "and to be the date " to the end.
43 & 44 Vict. c. 9	Statutes (Definition of Time) Act 1880	The whole act.
47 & 48 Vict. c. 62	Revenue Act 1884	In section 14, the second paragraph, that is the words from " Any reference " to " Exchequer and Audit Departments Act 1866" in the second place where that Act is referred to in the section.
52 & 53 Vict. c. 63	Interpretation Act 1889	The whole act except paragraphs (4), (5) and (14) of section 13 in their application to Northern Ireland.
53 & 54 Vict. c. 21	Inland Revenue Regulation Act 1890	In section 38(1), the words from "and" to " of this Act ".
59 & 60 Vict. c. 14	Short Titles Act 1896	Section 3.
SR&O 1923/405	Irish Free State (Consequential Adaptation of Enactments) Order 1923	In the Schedule, the entry relating to the Interpretation Act 1889.
15 & 16 Geo. 5. No. 1	Interpretation Measure 1925	Section 1.
17 & 18 Geo. 5. c. 4	Royal and Parliamentary Titles Act 1927	In section 2(2) the words " Act passed and ".
22 & 23 Geo. 5. c. 4	Statute of Westminster 1931	Section 11.
11 & 12 Geo. 6. c. 7	Ceylon Independence Act 1947	Section 4(2).
11 & 12 Geo. 6. c. 56	British Nationality Act 1948	In section 1(2) the words " other enactment or " and the words " passed or ".
15 & 16 Geo. 6 & 1 Eliz. 2. c. 55	Magistrates' Courts Act 1952	In Schedule 5, the amendment of the Interpretation Act 1889.
4 & 5 Eliz. 2. c. 76	Medical Act 1956	Section 52(3).
5 & 6 Eliz. 2. c. 6	Ghana Independence Act 1957	Section 4(1).
8 & 9 Eliz. 2. c. 55	Nigeria Independence Act 1960	Section 3(1).
9 & 10 Eliz. 2. c. 16	Sierra Leone Independence Act 1961	Section 3(1).
10 & 11 Eliz. 2. c. 1	Tanganyika Independence Act 1961	Section 3(1).
10 & 11 Eliz. 2. c. 30	Northern Ireland Act 1962	Section 27.
10 & 11 Eliz. 2. c. 40	Jamaica Independence Act 1962	Section 3(1).
10 & 11 Eliz. 2. c. 54	Trinidad and Tobago Independence Act 1962	Section 3(1).
10 & 11 Eliz. 2. c. 57	Uganda Independence Act 1962	Section 3(1).
1963 c. 33	London Government Act 1963	In section 1, in subsection (1) the words " and any other " and in subsection (6) the words from " and section 15 " to " that is to say ".
1963 c. 54	Kenya Independence Act 1963	Section 4(1).
1964 c. 46	Malawi Independence Act 1964	Section 4(1).
1964 c. 48	Police Act 1964	In section 62 the words from " and in any other enactment " to " this Act) ".
1964 c. 86	Malta Independence Act 1964	Section 4(1).
1964 c. 93	Gambia Independence Act 1964	Section 4(1).
1966 c. 14	Guyana Independence Act 1966	Section 5(1).
1966 c. 37	Barbados Independence Act 1966	Section 4(1).
1967 c. 4	West Indies Act 1967	Section 3(5).
1967 c. 66	Welsh Language Act 1967	Section 4.
1967 c. 77	Police (Scotland) Act 1967	In section 50, the words from " and in any other enactment" to "this Act)"; and in section 51, in subsection (4), the words from " and in any other enactment " to " this Act)".
1968 c. 8	Mauritius Independence Act 1968	Section 4(1).
1968 c. 13	National Loans Act 1968	Section 1(6).
1970 c. 10	Income and Corporation Taxes Act 1970	In section 526, in subsection (1) the words " and in any other Act"; and in subsection (2) the words " and in any Act passed after this Act."
1970 c. 50	Fiji Independence Act 1970	Section 4(1).
1971 c. 58	Sheriff Courts (Scotland) Act 1971	In section 4(3) the words from " (which" to " the said section 28 ".
1972 c. 68	European Communities Act 1972	In section 1(2) the words from "and except " to " Northern Ireland) ".
1972 c. 70	Local Government Act 1972	In section 269 the words from "in every Act "to " that date)" in the second place where those words occur.
1973 c. 14	Costs in Criminal Cases Act 1973	In section 13(1) the words " and in any other enactment providing for the payment of costs out of central funds ".
1973 c. 27	Bahamas Independence Act 1973	Section 4(1).
1973 c. 32	National Health Service Reorganisation Act 1973	In section 55(2), the words from the beginning to " that date; and ".
1973 c. 37	Water Act 1973	In section 2(3) the words " and any other enactment".
1973 c. 37	Water Act 1973	Section 38(2).
1975 c. 21	Criminal Procedure (Scotland) Act 1975	In Schedule 9, paragraph 6.
1975 c. 72	Children Act 1975	Section 89.
1975 c. 76	Local Land Charges Act 1975	In section 4 the words " and any other statutory provision ".
1976 c. 63	Bail Act 1976	In Schedule 2, the amendment of the Interpretation Act 1889.
1977 c. 45	Criminal Law Act 1977	In section 64(1) the words from " and, unless " to " this Act)".
1978 c. 12	Medical Act 1978	In Schedule 5, in paragraph 48 paragraph (b) and the word " and " immediately preceding that paragraph.
1978 c. 15	Solomon Islands Act 1978	Section 7(1).
1978 c. 20	Tuvalu Act 1978	Section 4(1).
