= Statutory interpretation =

Judicial interpretation of statutory law

Statutory interpretation is the process by which courts interpret and apply legislation. Some amount of interpretation is often necessary when a case involves a statute. Sometimes the words of a statute have a plain and a straightforward meaning, but in many cases, there is some ambiguity in the words of the statute that must be resolved by the judge. To find the meanings of statutes, judges use various tools and methods of statutory interpretation, including traditional canons of statutory interpretation, legislative history, and purpose. In common law jurisdictions, the judiciary may apply rules of statutory interpretation both to legislation enacted by the legislature and to delegated legislation such as administrative agency regulations.

== History ==
Statutory interpretation first became significant in common law systems, of which historically England is the exemplar. In Roman and civil law, a statute (or code) guides the magistrate, but there is no judicial precedent. In England, Parliament historically failed to enact a comprehensive code of legislation, which is why it was left to the courts to develop the common law; and having decided a case and given reasons for the decision, the decision would become binding on later courts.

Accordingly, a particular interpretation of a statute would also become binding, and it became necessary to introduce a consistent framework for statutory interpretation. In the construction (interpretation) of statutes, the principal aim of the court must be to carry out the "intention of Parliament", and the English courts developed three main rules (plus some minor ones) to assist them in the task. These were: the mischief rule, the literal rule, and the golden rule.

Statutes may be presumed to incorporate certain components, as Parliament is "presumed" to have intended their inclusion. For example:

- Offences defined in criminal statutes are presumed to require mens rea (a guilty intention by the accused): Sweet v Parsley.
- A statute is presumed to make no changes in the common law.
- A statute is presumed not to remove an individual's liberty, vested rights, or property.
- A statute is presumed not to apply to the Crown.
- A statute is presumed not to empower a person to commit a criminal offence.
- A statute is presumed not to apply retrospectively (whereas the common law is "declaratory": Shaw v DPP).
- A statute is to be interpreted so as to uphold international treaties to which the UK is a party. In the case of EU law, any statutory provision which contravenes the principle embodied in the EU treaties that EU law is supreme is effectively void: Factortame.
- It is presumed that a statute will be interpreted ejusdem generis ("of the same kind"), so that words are to be construed in sympathy with their immediate context.

Where legislation and case law are in conflict, there is a presumption that legislation takes precedence insofar as there is any inconsistency. In the United Kingdom this principle is known as parliamentary sovereignty; but while Parliament has exclusive competence to legislate, the courts (mindful of their historic role of having developed the entire system of common law) retain sole competence to interpret statutes.

== General principles ==
The age old process of application of the enacted law has led to the formulation of certain rules of interpretation. According to Cross, "Interpretation is the process by which the courts determine the meaning of a statutory provision for the purpose of applying it to the situation before them", while Salmond calls it "the process by which the courts seek to ascertain the meaning of the legislature through the medium of authoritative forms in which it is expressed". Interpretation of a particular statute depends upon the degree of creativity applied by the judges or the court in the reading of it, employed to achieve some stated end. It is often mentioned that common law statutes can be interpreted by using the Golden Rule, the Mischief Rule or the Literal Rule. However, according to Francis Bennion, author of texts on statutory interpretation, there are no such simple devices to elucidate complex statutes, "[i]nstead there are a thousand and one interpretative criteria".

=== Intention of the legislature ===
A statute is an edict of a legislature, and the conventional way of interpreting a statute is to seek the "intention" of its maker of framer. It is the judicature's duty to act upon the true intention of the legislature or the mens or sentential legis. The courts have to objectively determine the interpretation with guidance furnished by the accepted principles. If a statutory provision is open to more than one interpretation the court has to choose that interpretation which represents the true intention of the legislature. The function of the courts is only to expound and not to legislate.

=== Conflict of laws within a federation ===
Federal jurisdictions may presume that either federal or local government authority prevails in the absence of a defined rule. In Canada, there are areas of law where provincial governments and the federal government have concurrent jurisdiction. In these cases the federal law is held to be paramount. However, in areas where the Canadian constitution is silent, the federal government does not necessarily have superior jurisdiction. Rather, an area of law that is not expressly mentioned in Canada's Constitution will have to be interpreted to fall under either the federal residual jurisdiction found in the preamble of s. 91—known as the Peace, Order and Good Government clause—or the provinces residual jurisdiction of "Property and Civil Rights" under s. 92(13A) of the 1867 Constitution Act. This contrasts with other federal jurisdictions, notably the United States and Australia, where it is presumed that if legislation is not enacted pursuant to a specific provision of the federal Constitution, the states will have authority over the relevant matter in their respective jurisdictions, unless the state's definitions of their statutes conflicts with federally established or recognized rights

=== United States ===
==== Meaning ====
The judiciary interprets how legislation should apply in a particular case as no legislation unambiguously and specifically addresses all matters. Legislation may contain uncertainties for a variety of reasons:

- Words are imperfect symbols to communicate intent. They are ambiguous and change in meaning over time. The word "let" used to mean 'prevent' or 'hinder' and now means 'allow'. The word "peculiar" is used to mean both specific and unusual, e.g. "kangaroos are peculiar to Australia", and "it's very peculiar to see a kangaroo outside Australia".
- Unforeseen situations are inevitable, and new technologies and cultures make application of existing laws difficult. (e.g. does the use of a new cloning technique create an embryo within the meaning of statute enacted when embryos could only be created by fertilisation?)
- Uncertainties may be added to the statute in the course of enactment, such as the need for compromise or catering to special interest groups.

Therefore, the court must try to determine how a statute should be enforced. This requires statutory construction. It is a tenet of statutory construction that the legislature is supreme (assuming constitutionality) when creating law and that the court is merely an interpreter of the law. Nevertheless, in practice, by performing the construction the court can make sweeping changes in the operation of the law.

Moreover, courts must also often view a case's statutory context. While cases occasionally focus on a few key words or phrases, judges may occasionally turn to viewing a case in its whole in order to gain deeper understanding. The totality of the language of a particular case allows the Justices presiding to better consider their rulings when it comes to these key words and phrases.

Statutory interpretation is the process by which a court looks at a statute and determines what it means. A statute, which is a bill or law passed by the legislature, imposes obligations and rules on the people. Although legislature makes the Statute, it may be open to interpretation and have ambiguities. Statutory interpretation is the process of resolving those ambiguities and deciding how a particular bill or law will apply in a particular case.

Assume, for example, that a statute mandates that all motor vehicles travelling on a public roadway must be registered with the Department of Motor Vehicles (DMV). If the statute does not define the term "motor vehicles", then that term will have to be interpreted if questions arise in a court of law. A person driving a motorcycle might be pulled over and the police may try to fine him if his motorcycle is not registered with the DMV. If that individual argued to the court that a motorcycle is not a "motor vehicle", then the court would have to interpret the statute to determine what the legislature meant by "motor vehicle" and whether or not the motorcycle fell within that definition and was covered by the statute.

There are numerous rules of statutory interpretation. The first and most important rule is the rule dealing with the statute's plain language. This rule essentially states that the statute means what it says. If, for example, the statute says "motor vehicles", then the court is most likely to construe that the legislation is referring to the broad range of motorised vehicles normally required to travel along roadways and not "aeroplanes" or "bicycles" even though aeroplanes are vehicles propelled by a motor and bicycles may be used on a roadway.

In Australia and in the United States, the courts have consistently stated that the text of the statute is used first, and it is read as it is written, using the ordinary meaning of the words of the statute.

Below are various quotes on this topic from US courts:

- U.S. Supreme Court: "We begin with the familiar canon of statutory construction that the starting point for interpreting a statute is the language of the statute itself. Absent a clearly expressed legislative intention to the contrary, that language must ordinarily be regarded as conclusive." Consumer Product Safety Commission et al. v. GTE Sylvania, Inc. et al., 447 U.S. 102 (1980). "[I]n interpreting a statute a court should always turn to one cardinal canon before all others. ... [C]ourts must presume that a legislature says in a statute what it means and means in a statute what it says there." Connecticut National Bank v. Germain, 112 S. Ct. 1146, 1149 (1992). Indeed, "when the words of a statute are unambiguous, then, this first canon is also the last: 'judicial inquiry is complete.'" 503 U.S. 249, 254.
- 9th Circuit Court of Appeals: In the dissent from en banc rehearing of Silveira v. Lockyer 312 F.3rd 1052 (2002), dissent at 328 F.3d 567 (2003) at 575, Judge Kleinfeld stated "it is 'a cardinal principle of statutory construction that we must give effect, if possible, to every clause and word of a statute.' Williams v. Taylor, 529 U.S. 362, 404, 120 S.Ct. 1495, 146 L.Ed.2d 389 (2000)."
- Supreme Court of Virginia: "Every part of an act is presumed to be of some effect and is not to be treated as meaningless unless absolutely necessary." Red Ash Coal Corp. v. Absher, 153 Va. 332, 335, 149 S.E. 541, 542 (1929). This is known as the rule against surplusage.
- Supreme Court of Alaska: "In assessing statutory language, unless words have acquired a peculiar meaning, by virtue of statutory definition or judicial construction, they are to be construed in accordance with their common usage." Muller v. BP Exploration (Alaska) Inc., 923 P.2d 783, 787-88 (Alaska 1996);
- Arkansas Supreme Court: "When reviewing issues of statutory interpretation, we keep in mind that the first rule in considering the meaning and effect of a statute is to construe it just as it reads, giving the words their ordinary and usually accepted meaning in common language. When the language of a statute is plain and unambiguous, there is no need to resort to rules of statutory construction. A statute is ambiguous only where it is open to two or more constructions, or where it is of such obscure or doubtful meaning that reasonable minds might disagree or be uncertain as to its meaning. When a statute is clear, however, it is given its plain meaning, and this court will not search for legislative intent; rather, that intent must be gathered from the plain meaning of the language used. This court is very hesitant to interpret a legislative act in a manner contrary to its express language, unless it is clear that a drafting error or omission has circumvented legislative intent." Farrell v. Farrell, 365 Ark. 465, 231 S.W.3d 619. (2006)
- New Mexico Supreme Court: "The principal command of statutory construction is that the court should determine and effectuate the intent of the legislature using the plain language of the statute as the primary indicator of legislative intent." State v. Ogden, 118 N.M. 234, 242, 880 P.2d 845, 853 (1994) "The words of a statute ... should be given their ordinary meaning, absent clear and express legislative intention to the contrary", as long as the ordinary meaning does "not render the statute's application absurd, unreasonable, or unjust." State v. Rowell, 121 N.M. 111, 114, 908 P.2d 1379, 1382 (1995) When the meaning of a statute is unclear or ambiguous, we have recognized that it is "the high duty and responsibility of the judicial branch of government to facilitate and promote the legislature's accomplishment of its purpose." State ex rel. Helman v. Gallegos, 117 N.M. 346, 353, 871 P.2d 1352, 1359 (1994); New Mexico v. Juan, 2010-NMSC-041, August 9, 2010
- California Court of Appeals, 4th District: "Our role in construing a statute is to ascertain the intent of the Legislature so as to effectuate the purpose of the law. (People v. Jefferson (1999) 21 Cal.4th 86, 94 [86 Cal.Rptr.2d 893, 980 P.2d 441].) Because the statutory language is generally the most reliable indicator of that intent, we look first at the words themselves, giving them their usual and ordinary meaning. (People v. Lawrence (2000) 24 Cal.4th 219, 230 [99 Cal.Rptr.2d 570, 6 P.3d 228].) We do not, however, consider the statutory language in isolation, but rather examine the entire substance of the statute in order to determine the scope and purpose of the provision, construing its words in context and harmonizing its various parts. (People v. Acosta (2002) 29 Cal.4th 105, 112 [124 Cal.Rptr.2d 435, 52 P.3d 624].)" Alford v. Superior Court (People) (2003) 29 Cal.4th 1033, 1040
- United States Court of Appeals for the Second Circuit: "As in all statutory construction cases, we begin with the language of the statute. The first step is to determine whether the language at issue has a plain and unambiguous meaning with regard to the particular dispute in the case." Barnhart v. Sigmon Coal Co., 534 U.S. 438, 450 (2002); "[U]nless otherwise defined, statutory words will be interpreted as taking their ordinary, contemporary, common meaning." United States v. Piervinanzi, 23 F.3d 670, 677 (2nd Cir. 1994).
- Maryland Court of Appeals: "[W]e begin our analysis by reviewing the pertinent rules of [statutory construction]. Of course, the cardinal rule is to ascertain and effectuate legislative intent. To this end, we begin our inquiry with the words of the statute and, ordinarily, when the words of the statute are clear and unambiguous, according to their commonly understood meaning, we end our inquiry there also." Chesapeake and Potomac Telephone Co. of Maryland v. Director of Finance for Mayor and City Council of Baltimore, 343 Md. 567, 683 A.2d 512 (1996)
- Indiana Court of Appeals: "The first and often last step in interpreting a statute is to examine the language of the statute. We will not, however, interpret a statute that is clear and unambiguous on its face." Ashley v. State, 757 N.E.2d 1037, 1039, 1040 (2001).

==== Internal and external consistency ====
It is presumed that a statute will be interpreted so as to be internally consistent. A particular section of the statute shall not be divorced from the rest of the act. The ejusdem generis (or eiusdem generis, Latin for "of the same kind") rule applies to resolve the problem of giving meaning to groups of words where one of the words is ambiguous or inherently unclear. The rule states that where "general words follow enumerations of particular classes or persons or things, the general words shall be construed as applicable only to persons or things of the same general nature or kind as those enumerated".

A statute shall not be interpreted so as to be inconsistent with other statutes. Where there is an apparent inconsistency, the judiciary will attempt to provide a harmonious interpretation.

==== Statements of the legislature ====
Legislative bodies themselves may try to influence or assist the courts in interpreting their laws by placing into the legislation itself statements to that effect. These provisions have many different names, but are typically noted as:

- Recitals;
- Findings;
- Declarations, sometimes suffixed with of Policy or of Intent; or
- Sense of Congress, or of either house in multi-chamber bodies.

In most legislatures internationally, these provisions of the bill simply give the legislature's goals and desired effects of the law, and are considered non-substantive and non-enforceable in and of themselves.

However in the case of the European Union, a supranational body, the recitals in Union legislation must specify the reasons the operative provisions were adopted, and if they do not, the legislation is void. This has been interpreted by the courts as giving them a role in statutory interpretation with Klimas, Tadas and Vaiciukaite explaining "recitals in EC law are not considered to have independent legal value, but they can expand an ambiguous provision's scope. They cannot, however, restrict an unambiguous provision's scope, but they can be used to determine the nature of a provision, and this can have a restrictive effect."

== Canons ==
Also known as canons of construction, canons give common sense guidance to courts in interpreting the meaning of statutes. Most canons emerge from the common law process through the choices of judges. Proponents of the use of canons argue that canons constrain judges and limit the ability of courts to legislate from the bench. Critics, meanwhile, argue that judges almost always have a choice between canons leading to different results, so their use leads to judicial discretion in decision-making being merely hidden rather than reduced. These canons can be divided into three major groups:

1. Textual canons
2. Substantive canons
3. Deferential canons

=== Textual canons ===
Textual canons are rules of thumb for understanding the words of the text being analyzed. Some canons are still known by their traditional Latin names.

Plain meaning
When writing statutes, the legislature intends to use ordinary English words in their ordinary senses. The United States Supreme Court discussed the plain meaning rule in Caminetti v. United States, reasoning that "[i]t is elementary that the meaning of a statute must, in the first instance, be sought in the language in which the act is framed, and if that is plain ... the sole function of the courts is to enforce it according to its terms." If a statute's language is plain and clear, the Court further warned that "the duty of interpretation does not arise, and the rules which are to aid doubtful meanings need no discussion". This means that the plain meaning rule (and statutory interpretation as a whole) should only be applied when there is an ambiguity. Because the meaning of words can change over time, some scholars and judges recommend using dictionaries to define terms that were published or written around the time a statute was enacted.
Technical meaning
As opposed to the plain meaning rule, the technical meaning rule applies the specific context and rules of grammar that are applied if the term is well-defined and understood in a specific technical setting. To determine if there is a technical meaning, judges will look at whether the surrounding words are technical, and whether the act was directed to a technical audience. They can also look to the title, the purpose, or the legislative history to indicate whether there is technical meaning implied in the statute. This concept is most easily defined in the case Frigaliment Importing Co. v. B.N.S. Int'l Sales Corp., where it was disputed whether the term "chicken" was a technical word in context or whether plain meaning applied.
Rule against surplusage
Where one reading of a statute would make one or more parts of the statute redundant and a second reading would avoid the redundancy, the second reading is preferred.
In pari materia ("part of the same material")
When similar statutory provisions are found in comparable statutory schemes, interpretations should presumptively apply the same way.
Ejusdem generis ("of the same kinds, class, or nature")
When a list of two or more specific descriptors is followed by more general descriptors, the otherwise wide meaning of the general descriptors should be restricted to the same class, if any, of the specific words that precede them. For example, where "cars, motor bikes, and other motor-powered vehicles" are mentioned, the word "vehicles" should generally be interpreted in a limited, land-bound sense and so not to include airplanes). The rule can also be applied when general words precede more specific ones, with general terms limited to things similar to those specifically listed. While some scholars see ejusdem generis as a subset of noscitur a sociis, most judges do not hold this belief.
Expressio unius est exclusio alterius ("the express mention of one thing excludes all others" or "the expression of one is the exclusion of others")
Items not on a list are impliedly assumed not to be covered by the statute or a contract term. However, sometimes a list in a statute is illustrative, not exclusionary. This is usually indicated by a word such as "including" or "such as". This canon, also called expressio unius for short, may exclude everything listed of the same type as the things listed, without excluding things of a different type. In order to properly execute this canon, one must find the normative baseline and determine whether the excluded terms would be included within the normative baseline or fall outside of it. This canon is not favored by most scholars, lawyers, or judges.
Noscitur a sociis ("it is known by its associates")
When a word is ambiguous, its meaning may be determined by reference to the rest of the statute. This canon is often used to narrow the interpretation of terms in a list. If two or more words grouped together have similar meaning, but are not equally comprehensive, a more general word will generally be limited and qualified by a more specific one.
Reddendo singula singulis ("rendering each to each")
This maxim is most commonly applied in property law. When in a document an expression is made of the form "A and B to C and D", but A is inapplicable to D and B to C, generally A should be applied to C and B to D.
Generalia specialibus non derogant ("the general does not derogate from the specific")
If a later law and an earlier law are potentially but not necessarily in conflict, courts will generally adopt the reading that does not result in an implied repeal of any part of the earlier statute. Lawmaking bodies usually need to be explicit if they intend to repeal an earlier law. This canon was described in The Vera Cruz as follows: "where there are general words in a later Act capable of reasonable and sensible application without extending them to subjects specially dealt with by earlier legislation, you are not to hold that earlier legislation indirectly repealed, altered, or derogated from merely by force of such general words, without any evidence of a particular intention to do so".

=== Substantive canons ===
Substantive canons instruct the court to favor interpretations that promote certain values or policy results.

Charming Betsy canon
National statute should be construed so as not to conflict with international law. See Murray v. The Charming Betsy, 6 U.S. (2 Cranch) 64 (1804): "It has also been observed that an act of Congress ought never to be construed to violate the law of nations if any other possible construction remains ..."
Interpretation in light of fundamental values
A statute should be construed not to violate fundamental societal values. See, for example, Holy Trinity Church v. United States, or Coco v The Queen (Australia). However, legislation that is intended to be consistent with fundamental rights may be overridden by clear and unambiguous language.
Rule of lenity
In construing an ambiguous criminal statute, a court should resolve the ambiguity in favor of the defendant. See McNally v. United States; Muscarello v. United States (declining to apply the rule of lenity); Evans v. United States; Scarborough v. United States]l; and United States v. Santos. This is similar to a junior version of the vagueness doctrine, and can be used for either criminal or civil penalty.
Avoidance of abrogation of state sovereignty (United States)
Unless it explicitly states otherwise, a federal statute should not be interpreted to abrogate state sovereign rights. See Gregory v. Ashcroft; see also Gonzales v. Oregon; see also Nevada Department of Human Resources v. Hibbs, except where such would deprive the defendant of bedrock, foundational rights that the federal government intended to be the minimum floor that the states were not allowed to fall beneath: Dombrowski v Pfister. This rule, known in some contexts as subsidiarity, is a hallmark of federalism and although it may be respected as a political principle, it does not hold as a legal rule in unitary states such as the United Kingdom.
'Indian' canon (United States)
A national statute must be construed in favor of Native Americans. See Chickasaw Nation v. United States: "statutes are to be construed liberally in favor of Indians with ambiguous provisions interpreted to their benefit." This canon can be likened to the doctrine of contra proferentem in contract law.

=== Deferential canons ===
Deferential canons instruct the court to defer to the interpretation of another institution, such as an administrative agency or Congress. These canons reflect an understanding that the judiciary is not the only branch of government entrusted with constitutional responsibility.

Deference to administrative interpretations (United States Chevron deference) (defunct)
If a statute administered by an agency is ambiguous with respect to the specific issue, courts should defer to the agency's reasonable interpretation of the statute. This rule of deference was formulated by the United States Supreme Court in Chevron U.S.A., Inc. v. Natural Resources Defense Council. In the landmark 2024 case Loper Bright Enterprises v. Raimondo, the Supreme Court explicitly overturned the doctrine of Chevron deference. The case was cited as precedent in a federal case (Tennessee v. Becerra) the very next week. Loper says, in part, "Chevron is overruled. Courts must exercise their independent judgment in deciding whether an agency has acted within its statutory authority, as the APA [Administrative Procedure Act] requires." As such, this canon is no longer good law in the United States.
Constitutional avoidance
If a statute is susceptible to more than one reasonable construction, courts should choose an interpretation that avoids raising constitutional problems. In the US, this canon has grown stronger in recent history. The traditional avoidance canon required the court to choose a different interpretation only when one interpretation was actually unconstitutional. The modern avoidance canon tells the court to choose a different interpretation even when another interpretation merely raises constitutional doubts. The avoidance canon was discussed in the 2014 Supreme Court case Bond v. United States, where the defendant placed toxic chemicals on surfaces frequently touched by a friend. The statute in question made using a chemical weapon a crime; however, the separation of power between states and the federal government may have been infringed upon if the Supreme Court interpreted the statute to extend to local crimes. Therefore, the Court utilized the canon of constitutional avoidance and decided to "read the statute more narrowly, to exclude the defendant's conduct".
Avoiding absurdity
A statute should be interpreted according to the assumption that the legislature did not intend an absurd or manifestly unjust result. In jurisprudence in the United States, "an absurdity is not mere oddity. The absurdity bar is high, as it should be. The result must be preposterous, one that 'no reasonable person could intend'". Moreover, the avoidance applies only when "it is quite impossible that Congress could have intended the result ... and where the alleged absurdity is so clear as to be obvious to most anyone". "To justify a departure from the letter of the law upon that ground, the absurdity must be so gross as to shock the general moral or common sense", with an outcome "so contrary to perceived social values that Congress could not have 'intended' it". The application of this rule in the United Kingdom is not entirely clear. The literal meaning rule – that if "Parliament's meaning is clear, that meaning is binding no matter how absurd the result may seem" – has a tension with the "golden rule", permitting courts to avoid absurd results in cases of ambiguity. At times, courts are not "concerned with what parliament intended, but simply with what it has said in the statute". Different judges have different views. In Nothman v. London Borough of Barnet, Lord Denning of the Court of Appeals attacked "those who adopt the strict literal and grammatical construction of the words" and argued that "[t]he literal method is now completely out-of-date [and] replaced by the ... 'purposive' approach". On appeal, however, Lord Russell in the House of Lords "disclaim[ed] the sweeping comments of Lord Denning". The related principle of Wednesbury reasonableness, as set out in the leading case Associated Provincial Picture Houses Ltd v Wednesbury Corporation in 1947, is not a rule of statutory interpretation and does not apply to acts of Parliament, which cannot be judicially reviewed.
Clear statement rule
When a statute may be interpreted to abridge long-held rights of individuals or states, or make a large policy change, courts will not interpret the statute to make the change unless clearly stated by the legislature. This clear statement rule is based on the assumption that the legislature would not make major changes in a vague or unclear way, and to ensure that voters are able to hold the appropriate legislators responsible for the modification. In the United States, this canon overlaps with that of avoidance of abrogation of state sovereignty.
Leges posteriores priores contrarias abrogant ("Subsequent laws repeal prior contrary laws", a.k.a. "Last in Time")
When two statutes necessarily conflict but the latter does not explicitly repeal the former, the one enacted last prevails. See implied repeal and derogation.

=== Criticism ===
Critics of the use of canons argue that canons impute a sort of "omniscience" to the legislature, implying that it is always aware of the canons when constructing laws. In addition, it is argued that the canons give a credence to judges who want to construct the law a certain way, imparting a false sense of justification to an otherwise arbitrary process. In a famous article, Karl Llewellyn argued that every canon had a "counter-canon" that would lead to the opposite interpretation of the statute.

Some scholars argue that interpretive canons should be understood as an open set, despite conventional assumptions that traditional canons capture all relevant language generalizations. Empirical evidence, for example, suggests that ordinary people readily incorporate a "nonbinary gender canon" and "quantifier domain restriction canon" in the interpretation of legal rules.

Other scholars argue that the canons should be reformulated as "canonical" or archetypical queries helping to direct genuine inquiry rather than purporting to somehow help provide answers in themselves.

== European thought ==
The French philosopher Montesquieu (1689–1755) believed that courts should act as "the mouth of the law", but soon it was found that some interpretation is inevitable. Following the German scholar Friedrich Carl von Savigny (1779–1861) the four main interpretation methods are:

- Grammatical interpretation: using the literal meaning of the statutory text.
- Historical interpretation: using the legislative history, to reveal the intent of the legislator.
- Systematic interpretation: considering the context of provisions, if only by acknowledging in which chapter a provision is listed.
- Teleological interpretation: considering the purpose of the statute (Latin: ratio legis), as it appears from legislative history, or other observations.

It is controversial whether there is a hierarchy between interpretation methods. Germans prefer a "grammatical" (literal) interpretation, because the statutory text has a democratic legitimation, and "sensible" interpretations are risky, in particular in view of German history. "Sensible" means different things to different people. The modern, common-law perception that courts actually make law is very different. In a German perception, courts can only further develop law (Rechtsfortbildung).

All of the above methods may seem reasonable:

- It may be considered undemocratic to ignore the literal text, because only that text was passed through democratic processes. Indeed, there may be no single legislative "intent" other than the literal text that was enacted by the legislature, because different legislators may have different views about the meaning of an enacted statute. It may also be considered unfair to depart from the literal text because a citizen reading the literal text may not have fair notice that a court would depart from its literal meaning, nor fair notice as to what meaning the court would adopt. It may also be unwise to depart from the literal text if judges are generally less likely than legislatures to enact wise policies.
- But it may also seem unfair to ignore the intent of the legislators, or the system of the statutes. So for instance in Dutch law, no general priority sequence for the above methods is recognized.

The freedom of interpretation varies by area of law. Criminal law and tax law must be interpreted very strictly, and never to the disadvantage of citizens, but liability law requires more elaborate interpretation, because here (usually) both parties are citizens. Here the statute may even be interpreted contra legem in exceptional cases, if otherwise a patently unreasonable result would follow.

== International treaties ==
The interpretation of international treaties is governed by another treaty, the Vienna Convention on the Law of Treaties, notably Articles 31–33. Some states (such as the United States) are not a parties to the treaty, but recognize that the Convention is, at least in part, merely a codification of customary international law.

The rule set out in the Convention is essentially that the text of a treaty is decisive unless it either leaves the meaning ambiguous, or obscure, or leads to a result that is manifestly absurd or unreasonable. Only in that case is recourse to "supplementary means of interpretation", such as the preparatory works (travaux préparatoires), allowed.

== Statutory interpretation methods ==
Within the United States, purposivism and textualism are the two most prevalent methods of statutory interpretation. Also recognized is the theory of intentionalists, which is to prioritize and consider sources beyond the text.

"Purposivists often focus on the legislative process, taking into account the problem that Congress was trying to solve by enacting the disputed law and asking how the statute accomplished that goal." Purposivists believe in reviewing the processes surrounding the power of the legislative body as stated in the constitution as well as the rationale that a "reasonable person conversant with the circumstances underlying enactment would suppress the mischief and advance the remedy" Purposivists would understand statutes by examining "how Congress makes its purposes known, through text and reliable accompanying materials constituting legislative history."

"In contrast to purposivists, textualists focus on the words of a statute, emphasizing text over any unstated purpose."

Textualists believe that everything which the courts need in deciding on cases are enumerated in the text of legislative statutes. In other words, if any other purpose was intended by the legislature then it would have been written within the statutes and since it is not written, it implies that no other purpose or meaning was intended. By looking at the statutory structure and hearing the words as they would sound in the mind of a skilled, objectively reasonable user of words, textualists believe that they would respect the constitutional separation of power and best respect legislative supremacy. Critiques of modern textualism on the United States Supreme Court abound.

Intentionalists refer to the specific intent of the enacting legislature on a specific issue. Intentionalists can also focus on general intent. Private motives do not eliminate the common goal that the legislature carries. This theory differs from others mainly on the types of sources that will be considered. Intentional theory seeks to refer to as many different sources as possible to consider the meaning or interpretation of a given statute. This theory is adjacent to a contextualist theory, which prioritizes the use of context to determine why a legislature enacted any given statute.

== See also ==
- Golden rule
- Indeterminacy debate in legal theory
- Interpretation Act
- Judicial activism
- Judicial interpretation
- Legal interpretation in South Africa
- Legal science
- Literal rule
- Mischief rule
- Original intent — Original meaning — Textualism
- Pepper v. Hart [1993] AC 573
- Rule of law
- Statutory term analysis
- Sui generis § Statutory
- UK Interpretation Act (1850)
