= Canon law of the Church of England =

The Church of England, like the other autonomous member churches of the Anglican Communion, has its own system of canon law.

The principal body of canon law enacted since the Reformation is the Book of Canons approved by the Convocations of Canterbury and York in 1604 and 1606 respectively. There are 141 canons in the collection, some of which reaffirm medieval prescriptions, while others depend on Matthew Parker's Book of Advertisements and the Thirty-nine Articles. They were drawn up in Latin by Richard Bancroft, Bishop of London, and only the Latin text is authoritative. They were published in separate Latin and English editions in 1604. A few, e.g. canon 37, were amended in the 19th century. In 1640 William Laud proposed 17 new canons but his proposal was ultimately not implemented. A Canon Law Commission was appointed in 1939 to reconsider the matter of canon law in the Church of England: it held eight sessions between 1943 and 1947 and then issued a report which included a full set of new canons which were subsequently considered by Convocation.

The new Canons of the Church of England were promulged by the Convocations in 1964 (Canterbury) and 1969 (York), and replaced the whole of the 1604 Canons except the proviso to Canon 113 (which relates to Confession). The 7th edition, incorporating amendments made by the General Synod up to 2010, was published in 2012. An updated version is available online.

A Church of England canon is primary legislation that is made by the General Synod of the Church of England. Unlike measures, canons are not approved by the Parliament of the United Kingdom.

== Procedure ==
Every canon must be approved by the General Synod with the system using a series of committees similar to the three readings of the British Parliament and other similar legislatures.

== Channel Islands ==
=== Jersey ===
There is a version of the Canons for Jersey, described as "Unofficial extended UK law". Alongside the details contained in Channel Islands Measure 2020, a 2019 report recommended adopting a new set of canons.

=== Guernsey ===
Similarly to Jersey, it was recommended that a new set of canons for Guernsey.

=== Isle of Man ===
The canons apply to the Isle of Man.

== See also ==
- Arches Court
- Canon law (Anglican Communion)
- Chancery Court of York
- Channel Islands Measure 2020
- Consistory court
- Court of Ecclesiastical Causes Reserved
- Court of the Archdeacon
- Court of the Vicar-General of the Province of Canterbury
- Court of the Vicar-General of the Province of York
- Court of Peculiars
- Dean of the Arches
- Ecclesiastical court
- Ecclesiastical Jurisdiction Act 1677
- Ecclesiastical Jurisdiction Measure 1963
- Ecclesiastical Law Society
- Excommunicato interdictur omnis actus legitimus, ita quod agere non potest, nec aliquem convenire, licet ipse ab aliis possit conveniri
- Faculty Office
- King's Advocate
