= Master of the Faculties =

Legal position in the office of the Archbishop of Canterbury

The Master of the Faculties is a judicial officer in the Faculty Office of the Archbishop of Canterbury and has some important powers in English law, in particular the appointment and regulation of public notaries. Since 1873 the position has always been held by the Dean of the Arches.

== Functions ==
The Master of Faculties has retained his or her historical responsibility with respect to public notaries in England and Wales. This regulatory function is now subject to the statutory provisions of the Public Notaries Acts 1801 and 1843, and the Courts and Legal Services Act 1990. The Master of Faculties is an approved regulator under the Legal Services Act 2007: he or she is the sole relevant approved regulator for notaries. As notaries in England and Wales may also carry out certain non-contentious legal work, he or she may thereby be a relevant approved regulator for certain dealings in land registration and real property, and for probate and the administration of oaths. (Most, but not all, public notaries are also practising solicitors, so would carry out these functions in that capacity, and thus be regulated by the Solicitors Regulation Authority.)

The Master of Faculties also has responsibility for the issue of special licences for marriage in England and Wales, and for Lambeth degrees.

Public notaries in some Commonwealth jurisdictions, such as New Zealand and Queensland, Australia, are still appointed through the office of the Archbishop of Canterbury, though in all other Australian States and Territories they are appointed by the relevant supreme court.

== History ==
Following the English Reformation, the Ecclesiastical Licences Act 1533, s.3 gave the Archbishop, or "hys commissarie", power to issue "suche licences dispensacions composicions faculties delegacies rescriptes instrumentes or wrytynges have byn accustomed to be had, at the See of Rome". This included the power to appoint notaries in the ecclesiastical courts and the office of commissarie developed into that of the Master of the Faculties.

The Master was formerly the principal officer of the Court of Faculties, one of the ecclesiastical courts, and also had the power, under the 1533 Act to:

- Create rights as to pews, monuments, and rights of burial places; or
- Grant licences such as a faculty to erect an organ in a parish church, to level a churchyard, or to exhume bodies buried in a church cemetery.

== List of Masters of the Faculties ==
- Sir Charles Caesar (1638–1642)
- Robert Aylett (appointed 1642)
- ...
- Sir John Birkenhead
- ...
- Henry Paman (1684–1689)
- Sir Charles Hedges (1689–1714)
- ...
- Rt Revd Samuel Halifax (1770–1790)
- Lord Stowell (appointed 1790)
- ...
- John Nicoll (1838–1841
- Sir John Dodson (1841–1857)
- Stephen Lushington (1858–1873)
- Sir Robert Phillimore QC (1873–1875)
- Lord Penzance (1875–1898)
- Sir Arthur Charles (1898–1903)
- Sir Lewis Dibdin QC (1903–1934)
- Sir Philip Wilbraham Baker Wilbraham, Bt (1934–1955)
- Sir Henry Willink QC (1955–1971)
- Walter Wigglesworth QC (1971–1972)
- Sir Harold(Pecker) Kent QC (1972–1976)
- Revd Kenneth Elphinstone QC (1977–1980)
- Sir John Owen QC (1980–2000)
- Sheila Cameron QC (2000–2009)
- Charles George QC (2009–2020)
- Morag Ellis QC (2020–present)

== Bibliography ==
- Ayliffe, J. Parergon juris canonici anglicani: or, A commentary, by way of supplement to the canons and constitutions of the Church of England 384
- Brooks, C. W.; et al. (1991). Notaries Public in England and Wales since the Reformation. Norwich: Erskine Press.
- Cheney, C. R. (1972). Notaries Public in England in the Thirteenth and Fourteenth Centuries. Oxford: Oxford University Press. p. 4. ISBN 0-19-822352-8.
- Lord Mackay of Clashfern (ed.) (1997) Halsbury's Laws of England, 4th ed. Vol.14, "Ecclesiastical Law", 1273
- — 4th ed. reissue Vol.33 "Notaries", 702
