= Judge Owen =

Judge Owen may refer to:

- John Owen (judge), British barrister, High Court judge, and ecclesiastical judge
- Neville Owen (fl. 1960s–2010s), judge of the Court of Appeal of the Supreme Court of Western Australia
- Priscilla Owen (born 1954), circuit judge of the United States Court of Appeals for the Fifth Circuit
- Richard Owen (judge) (1922–2015), judge of the United States District Court for the Southern District of New York
- Robert Owen (Australian politician) (1799–1878), judge of the District Court of New South Wales
- Tudor Owen (judge) (born 1951), British Circuit judge

== See also ==
- Owen M. Panner (1924–2018), judge of the United States District Court for the District of Oregon
- Owen Rogers (born 1958), judge of the Constitutional Court of South Africa
- Owen P. Thompson (1852-1933), judge of the Seventh Judicial District of Illinois
- Judge Owens (1916–2001), American Negro league infielder
- Justice Owen (disambiguation)
