= Court of the Vicar-General of the Province of York =

Office in the Church of England

The Court of the Vicar-General of the Province of York is responsible for granting Marriage Licences in the Province of York of the Church of England. The Vicar-General of the Province and Official Principal of the Consistory Court is distinct from the Dean of the Arches. The Registrar is the Registrar of the Chancery Court of York.

== List of Vicars-General ==
- PN Collier, QC 2008–
- TAC Coningsby, QC 1980–2008
- Rev'd Kenneth Elphinstone, QC 1972–1980
- Walter Wigglesworth, QC 1944–1972
- HB Vaisey, KC c.1938
- Sir Philip Wilbraham Baker Wilbraham, Bt, 1915–1934
- Rt Hon Sir Charles Cripps, KCVO 1900– [Lord Parmoor cr 1914]
- Edmund Beckett, 1st Baron Grimthorpe, QC 1877–1900 s:Beckett, Edmund (DNB12)

== See also ==
- Court of the Vicar-General of the Province of Canterbury
