= Court of the Vicar-General of the Province of Canterbury =

The Court of the Vicar-General of the Province of Canterbury is responsible for granting marriage licences in the Province of Canterbury of the Church of England. The Vicar-General is distinct from the Dean of the Arches. The Registrars are the Joint Provincial Registrars. A Vicar-General is appointed by the Archbishop, and by certain other bishops to assist with such matters as ecclesiastical visitations. The Vicar-General of the Diocese is distinct from the Vicar-General of the Province. The Registry of the Vicar-General of the Province is 16 Beaumont Street, Oxford OX1 2LZ.

== List of Vicars-General ==
- Chancellor Timothy Briden, 2005–
- Miss Sheila Cameron, QC 1983–2005
- Michael Bradley Goodman 1977–1983
- Sir Harold Kent, GCB QC 1971–1976
- Rt Hon Sir Henry Willink, Bt MC QC 1955–1971
- Sir Philip Wilbraham Baker Wilbraham, Bt. KBE 1934–1955
- Henry Dashwood 1939–1948
- Lewis Dibdin KC 1925–1934
- Rt Hon Sir Charles Cripps, KCVO 1902–1924
- Sir James Parker Deane c.1898
- Sir Travers Twiss 1852–1872
- Sir John Dodson 1849–1852
- Rt Hon John Iltyd Nicholl 1838–1841
- Rt Hon Sir John Nicholl 1834–1838

== See also ==
- Court of the Vicar-General of the Province of York
