= Dibdin =

People whose surname is or was Dibdin include:

- Charles Dibdin (1745–1814), British writer and musician
- Charles Dibdin the younger (1768–1833), English dramatist, composer and theatre proprietor
- Lewis Tonna Dibdin (1852–1938) British lawyer and Dean of the Arches
- Michael Dibdin (1947–2007), British crime writer
- Thomas Frognall Dibdin (1776–1847), British bibliographer
- Thomas John Dibdin (1771–1841), British dramatist
- British politician Michael Heseltine, whose middle name is Dibdin, is a distant descendant of Charles Dibdin.
