= Church of England canon =

Church of England canon may refer to

- Canon (title) - the title of "canon" to describe a person within the Church of England
- Canon law of the Church of England
