= Faculty Office =

Tribunal of the Archbishop of Canterbury

The Faculty Office of the Archbishop of Canterbury is a regulatory body in English law, which also exercises some adjudicatory functions. Its responsibilities include:

- the regulation of notaries public;
- the issue of special marriage licences (but not common marriage licences); (Note: Special licences permit the parties to marry before a member of the clergy and according to an Anglican order of service otherwise than in a church: for example, in a school, college or university chapel; or anywhere, if one of the parties to the intended marriage is in danger of imminent death.)
- the conferral of Lambeth degrees.

The Faculty Office is presided over by the Master of the Faculties, who is appointed by the Archbishop of Canterbury subject to approval by the Crown. Its jurisdiction is exercised by the Court of Faculties and applies to England and Wales. The jurisdiction was conferred upon the Archbishop by the Ecclesiastical Licences Act 1533 (25 Hen. 8. c. 21) as part of the Reformation in England. This Act transferred to the Archbishop of Canterbury powers which had until then been exercised by the Papal Legate to England. For this reason, they are sometimes called the "legatine powers". They are exercised by the Archbishop of Canterbury not only in the Province of Canterbury but also in the Province of York and the area covered by the Church in Wales.

Notaries public in New Zealand and the State of Queensland, Australia are still appointed by the Faculty Office.

== See also ==
- Ecclesiastical law
- Ecclesiastical court
