= Tudor Owen =

Tudor Owen may refer to:

- Tudor Owen (actor) (1898–1979), Welsh actor
- Tudor Owen (judge) (born 1951), British judge

== See also ==
- Owen Tudor (disambiguation)
- Owen (name)
