= King of Ink Land King Body Art The Extreme Ink-Ite =

Most tattooed man in the United Kingdom

King of Ink Land King Body Art The Extreme Ink-Ite (formerly Matthew Whelan) (Birmingham, United Kingdom, 27 November 1979) is the most tattooed man in the United Kingdom.

In 2013, the HM Passport Office refused to issue King a passport, claiming that his unusual name didn't fit their policies, even though he has changed his name by deed poll. He successfully challenged this decision and obtained his passport in July 2014.

King has over 90% of his body covered in ink. In 2014, he became a two-time world record holder, having had 29 tattoo artists tattoo him at the same time.

In 2016, King broke his 2014 record by having 36 tattoo artists ink him at the same time. He described this feat as being "not very easy and with a lot of pain".

In October 2026 King found a premium brand called Boulle. Quality mens style smart casual clothing from micro fleece jackets to polo tops and jumpers. His inspiration came from customised sportwear in 2020 whilst under the EFL FIT FANS banner at Birmingham City Football Club and creating Birmingham City Fitness (2020) Boulle
