= Cheeswrights =

English firm of Scrivener Notaries

Cheeswrights LLP is one of the largest and oldest firms of Scrivener Notaries based in London, England.

Cheeswrights Notaries Public was founded in 1779 by Thomas Clark. Henry Cornfoot Cheeswright, who was granted his notarial faculty in 1838 and gave the firm its name, was a ship owner and the founder of the first regular steamship route from London to the Channel Islands (1853).

In the nineteenth century Cheeswrights was located opposite the Custom House by Billingsgate Market where shipmasters reported their vessels' arrival at the Port of London. The partnership was the nearest firm of notaries public for masters intending to enter protests in respect of their voyages.

In 1931 Cheeswrights and Casey, as the firm was then known, amalgamated with another notarial firm, Duff Watts & Co.

Despite its maritime connection Cheeswrights—as the firm was styled since 1990—has always maintained a general notarial practice handling matters spanning all jurisdictions with the focus on most of the European languages and countries, the CIS countries and Latin America.

In May 2019 Cheeswrights converted from general partnership to limited liability partnership and became registered as Cheeswrights LLP.

== Notable Partners ==
Anthony (Tony) Burgess, the author of books on lawyers in opera and musical theatre The Notary and Other Lawyers in Gilbert and Sullivan (London: Jardine Press, 1997), and The Notary in Opera (London: Jardine Press, 1995). Awarded the Hellenic Gold Naval Medal, 1st class, for services to the Hellenic Merchant Marine.
