= Justice Owen =

Justice Owen may refer to:

- Daniel Owen (judge) (1732–1812), chief justice of the Rhode Island Supreme Court
- John Owen (judge) (1925–2010), justice of the High Court of England and Wales
- Langer Owen (1862–1935), justice of the Supreme Court of New South Wales
- Priscilla Owen (born 1954), justice of the Supreme Court of Texas
- Sir Robert Owen (judge) (born 1944), judge of the High Court of England and Wales
- Selwyn N. Owen (1836–1916), associate justice of the Supreme Court of Ohio
- Thomas Horner Owen (1873–1938), judge of the Oklahoma Supreme Court
- Walter C. Owen (1868–1934), associate justice of the Wisconsin Supreme Court
- William Owen (judge) (1899–1972), justice of the High Court of Australia

== See also ==
- Susan Owens (born 1949), associate justice of the Washington Supreme Court
- Owen Dixon (1886–1972), Chief Justice of Australia
- Owen Roberts (1875–1955), associate justice of the United States Supreme Court
- Owen Thomas Rouse (1843–1919), associate justice of the Arizona Territorial Supreme Court
- Judge Owen (disambiguation)
