= William Bird (lawyer) =

British lawyer and politician

- Born: 1560 or 1561; Saffron Walden, Essex, England
- Died: 1624
- Occupations: Lawyer, politician

Sir William Bird (1560 or 1561–1624) was a lawyer, Member of Parliament for Oxford University and Dean of the Court of Arches but who was accused in Parliament of taking improper fees.

== Life ==
Bird was born in Saffron Walden, Essex and matriculated at All Souls College, Oxford on 28 November 1581 aged 20, having become a Fellow in 1578. He studied civil law, obtaining the degrees of Bachelor of Civil Law (1583) and Doctor of Civil Law (1588) before becoming an advocate of the Court of Arches in 1589 and a member of Doctors' Commons in 1590. He was also acting Vice-Chancellor of Oxford University in 1591 and dean of All Souls College in 1593. He became more active in the courts, resigning his fellowship in 1604. In 1608 he became MP for the university in succession to Thomas Crompton. In 1611 he became a judge of the Prerogative Court of Canterbury along with John Bennet (judge), but became the sole judge in 1622 when Bennet was prosecuted for corruption. He was knighted in 1617 and became Dean of the Court of Arches in 1618. He was also a Master in Chancery but was one of four masters accused in the Parliament of 1621 of taking improper fees, although they argued that the statute relied upon by their accusers was not intended to deprive them of their fees. He was buried on 5 September 1624 in Christ Church, Newgate, London. He was survived by his wife, but they had no children.
