= Commonweal Lodge =

Location
- Woodcote Lane; Purley, Surrey, CR8 3HB; England
- Coordinates: 51°20′19″N 0°08′22″W

Information
- Type: Independent
- Established: 1916
- Founder: Margery Frances Bray
- Closed: 2010
- Local authority: London Borough of Croydon
- Department for Education URN: 511986 Tables
- Gender: Girls
- Age: 11 to 19
- Enrolment: 8 (1916) c. 70 (2010)
- Website: Official website (archived)

Commonweal Lodge was an independent school for girls aged between eleven and nineteen, located on the Webb Estate in Purley operating between 1916 and 2010.

== History ==
The school was opened in 1916 by Margery Frances Bray (1895–1962), together with Elsie Bourne (1879–1937), after she had been asked to do so by William Webb, who planned and built the Webb Estate, in 1915. The school opened in the "Woodcote" Smithy near the village green with eight pupils, including Mary Webb, daughter of William Webb. In January 1917, it moved to the purpose built construction designed by Sidney Tachell located in Woodcote Lane, where it remained until its closure.

In 1925, it was extended by the construction of seven new classrooms, a library, extended cloakrooms, kitchens and a new staffroom. In 1931, a swimming pool was added. During World War II, air raid shelters were built underneath the tennis courts. From 1941 to 1943, the school moved to Ardock, Lewdown, Devon, and the school buildings were occupied by military personnel, but by Autumn 1945 it was back, and by then had 70 pupils. In 1966, a gymnasium was built. In 1973, a second storey was added to the classrooms.

In 1997 the school merged with Downside School to create the association, Lodge School. Mixed pupils from the age of three attended the infant school, Silverdene Lodge, then continued in Downside Lodge from the age of six, and girls continued further in Commonweal Lodge from the age of eleven.

The school closed without prior warning during the summer school holiday in 2010, but the other two constituent schools of Lodge School remained open after the buildings were controversially bought for two million pounds by Linda Jenkins. The last head of the school was Pamela Maynard.

=== School heads ===
- 1916-1960 Margery Frances Bray
- 1960-1966 Molly Lockwood
- 1966-1982 Miss Blunden
- 1982-1995 Miss Brown
- 1995-1998 Mrs Law
- 1998-2010 Pamela Maynard

== Notable former pupils ==
- Sheila Cameron, lawyer
- Angharad Rees, actress
