= Ernest Charles (judge) =

English barrister and High Court judge

Sir Ernest Charles CBE

Justice of the High Court
- In office 1928–1947

Personal details
- Education: Clifton College; New College, Oxford

Sir Ernest Bruce Charles, CBE (1871 – 3 May 1950) was an English barrister and High Court judge from 1928 to 1947.

== Biography ==
Ernest Charles was the son of the High Court judge Sir Arthur Charles. He was educated at Clifton College and New College, Oxford, where he read Jurisprudence. He was called to the Bar at the Inner Temple in 1896, and acquired a large general practice on the Western Circuit and in London. He was appointed a King's Counsel in 1913 and became a Bencher of his Inn in 1922.

Although he was above military age, on the outbreak of the First World War, Charles abandoned his practice for war service, initially as an ambulance driver, then as part of the inquiry teams who tried to trace those missing in action. He eventually became Director of the Wounded and Missing Inquiry Department at Le Havre. For his wartime service, Charles was mentioned in dispatches in 1917, created a Knight of Grace of the Order of St John in April 1918 and appointed a Commander of the Order of the British Empire in 1919.

Returning to the Bar after the war, Charles once again built up a large practice, chiefly before juries. In 1923, he defended Dr Halliday Sutherland against a charge of libel by Marie Stopes. In 1924, he represented General O'Dwyer in a libel action against Sir Sankaran Nair. He also had a general retainer for the Corporation of London in rating cases.

Charles was Recorder of Bournemouth from 1915 to 1924 and Recorder of Southampton from 1924 to 1928. He was appointed a Justice of the High Court on 17 February 1928, and was assigned to the King's Bench Division, receiving the customary knighthood. In 1945, he tried U. S. Army deserver Karl Hultén and waitress Elizabeth Jones for the Cleft chin murder. He retired on 5 April 1947.

Like his father, Charles had an interest in ecclesiastical law. He was Commissary General of the Diocese of Canterbury, Chancellor of Wakefield and Hereford from 1912 to 1928, and Chancellor of Chelmsford from 1922 to 1928.

He was a noted local philanthropist in Deal, who helped to establish the local rowing and football clubs. The football ground and two streets in the town are named after him. A blue plaque in his honour was unveiled in 2018.
