= Court of the Archdeacon =

Obsolete ecclesiastical court of the Church of England

The Court of the Archdeacon, or Archdeaconry Court, is an obsolete ecclesiastical court of the Church of England. The court was presided over by a lawyer, and its territorial jurisdiction extended over an archdeaconry (a subdivision of a diocese, headed by an archdeacon). In many matters its jurisdiction overlapped with that of the Consistory Court (the court of the bishop of the diocese), and an appeal lay from the Archdeacon's Court to the Consistory Court, so in practice by the nineteenth century suitors used the higher rather than the lower court, and the Archdeacon's Court had become obsolete.

The Archdeacon's Court had jurisdiction over both clergy and laity. During the 16th, 17th and 18th centuries much of the business of the court involved offences against public morality, such as adultery and fornication, lewd behaviour, and also slander, giving rise to its popular nickname of "The Bawdy Court". Some of the more serious matters that the court had dealt with (including ensuring that fathers made financial provision for children born outside marriage) eventually came under the criminal or civil jurisdiction of the justices of the peace.
