= Owen Tudor (disambiguation) =

Owen Tudor was a Welsh courtier, grandfather of Henry VII.

Owen Tudor may also refer to:

- Owen Frederick Morton Tudor (1900–1987), officer in 3rd The King's Own Hussars and the husband of Larissa Tudor
- Owen Tudor (horse)

== See also ==
- Tudor Owen (disambiguation)
