= Harry Vaisey =

Sir Harry Vaisey

Justice of the High Court
- In office 1944–1960

Personal details
- Born: 22 June 1877
- Died: 24 November 1965 (aged 88)
- Education: Hertford College, Oxford

Sir Harry Bevir Vaisey (22 June 1877 – 24 November 1965) was a British judge, who sat in the Chancery Division of the High Court between 1944 and 1960. An authority on ecclesiastical law, he is remembered for some of his more colourful turns of phrase.

== Biography ==
Vaisey was educated at Shrewsbury School and Hertford College, Oxford, where he took Firsts in Classical Moderations in 1898 and Literae Humaniores in 1900. He was called to the bar by Lincoln's Inn in 1901 and devilled for a time for Mark Romer. He acquired a large general practice at the Chancery bar, took silk in 1925, and was elected Bencher of Lincoln's Inn in 1929.

A high churchman, he often appeared in front of ecclesiastical courts. He served as Chancellor of the dioceses of Derby and Wakefield from 1928 to 1944, Chancellor of the diocese of Carlisle from 1930 to 1944, Vicar-General of the Province of York from 1934 to 1944, and Commissary General for the Diocese of Canterbury from 1942 to 1944.

Vaisey was appointed to the High Court and assigned to the Chancery Division in 1944, receiving the customary knighthood. The appointment was unexpected, as Vaisey was 66 at the time and had been passed over for preferment several times. He retired in 1960.

Vaisey has a certain level of notoriety for some of his more colourful turns of phrase, for example he is noted as saying:

It is a fearful thing to contemplate that when you are driving along the road, a heavy horse may at any moment drop from the sky on top of you.

and:

A gentleman's agreement is an agreement which is not an agreement, made between two people neither of whom are gentlemen, whereby each expects the other to be strictly bound without himself being bound at all.

Vaisey also ruled that the law of England and Wales does not allow a person to change their given name. In Re Parrott, Cox v Parrott [1946] Ch 183, Vaisey stated that he knew of no way short of an Act of Parliament that a person's first name could be altered. The case hinged on a will that stipulated that the inheritor would only inherit if he changed his first name. Vaisey stated that he did not believe one could change one's first name by way of a deed of change of name (deed poll).

This precedent is widely ignored, but to register a deed of change of name in the High Court of England and Wales, a caveat must be endorsed on the deed along the lines of "Notwithstanding the decision of Mr Justice Vaisey in Re: Parrott, Cox v Parrott, the applicant desires the enrolment to proceed".
