= Worshipful Company of Scriveners =

Livery company of the City of London

Scriveners' Company
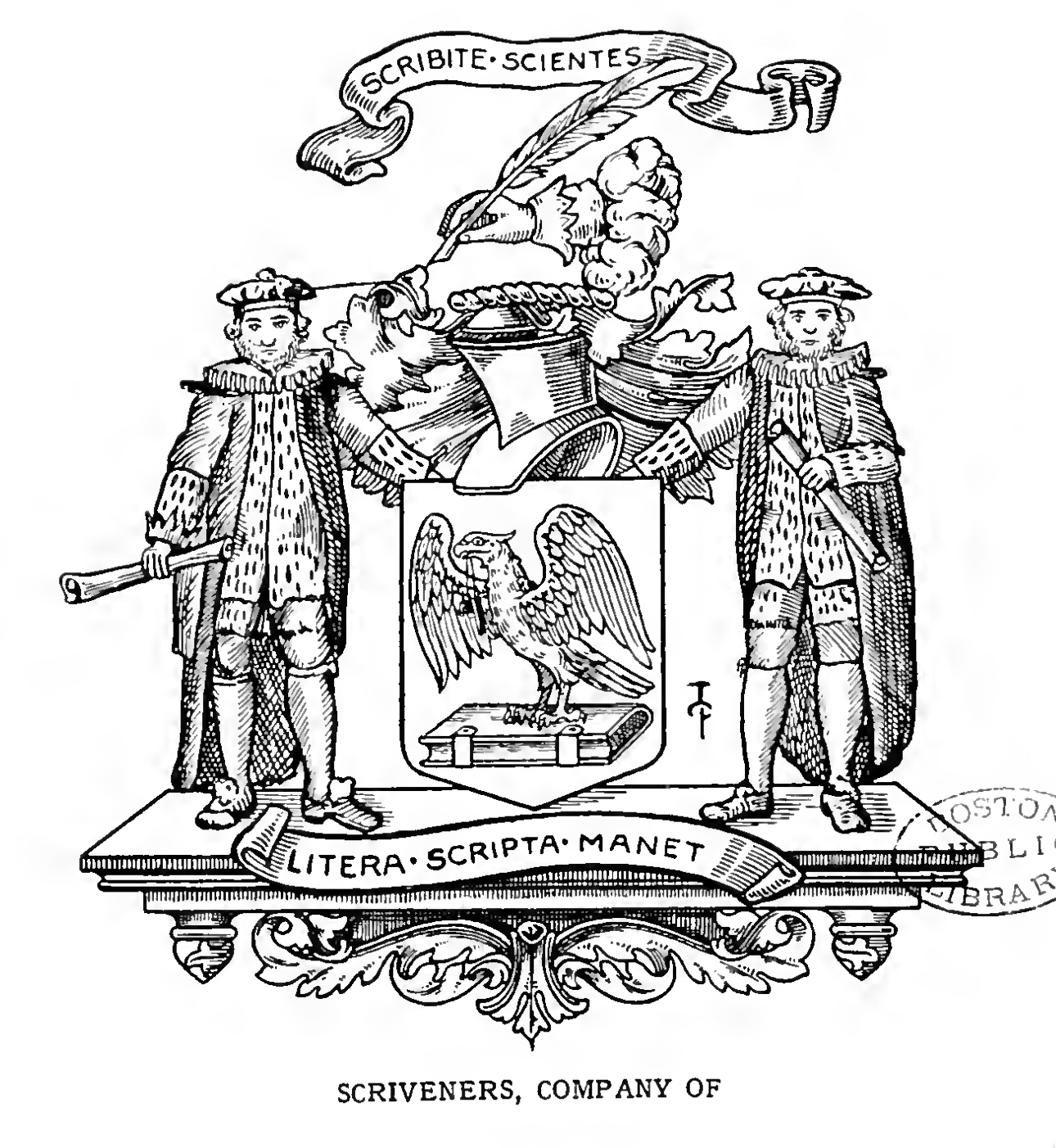
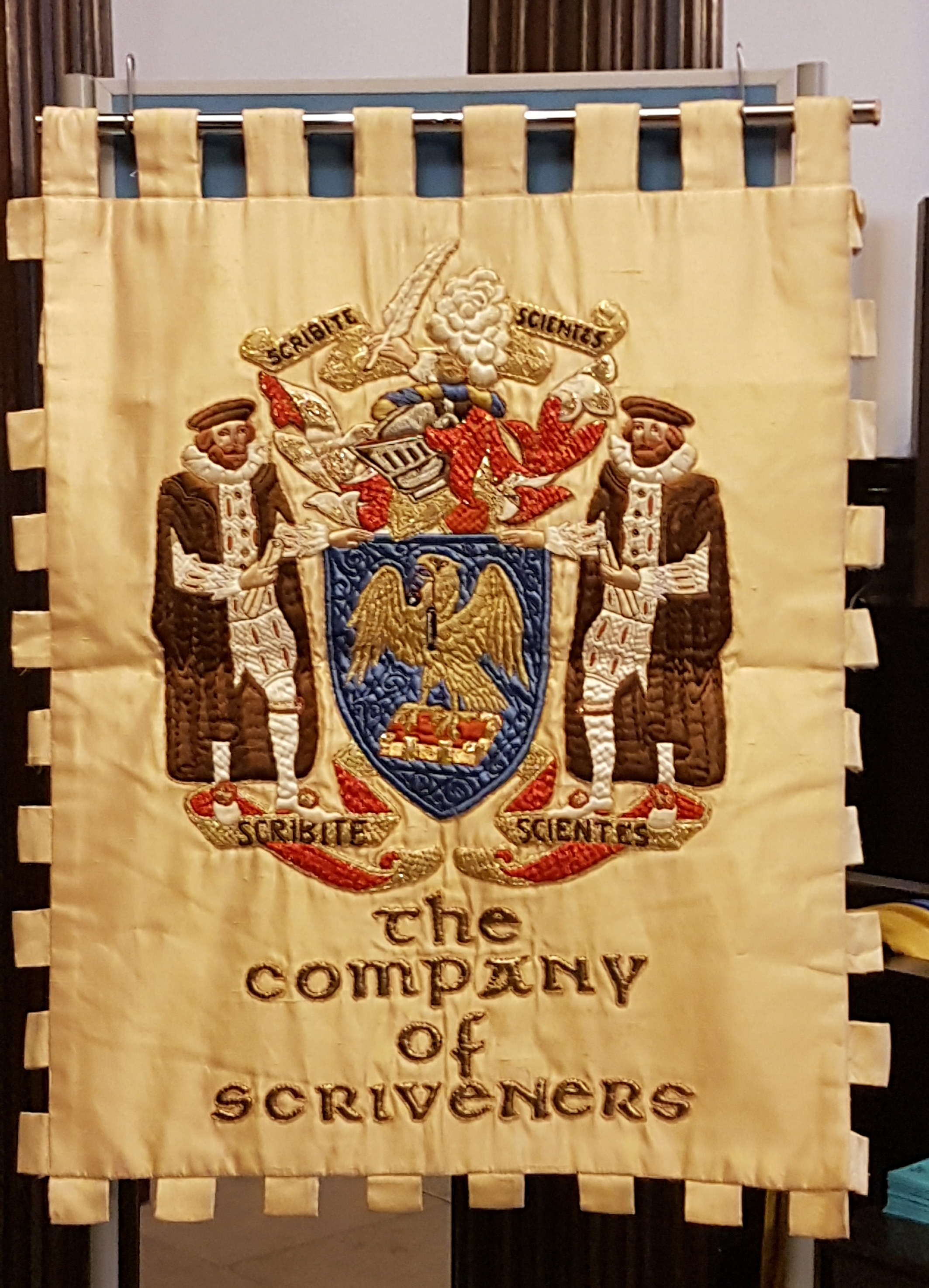
- Arms of the Worshipful Company of Scriveners
- Motto: Scribite Scientes
- Location: c/o Information Technologists' Hall, London EC1
- Date of formation: 1373; 653 years ago
- Company association: Legal (incl. ecclesiastical and heraldic) notary services
- Order of precedence: 44th
- Master of company: Mr Andrew Claudet
- Website: www.scriveners.org.uk

The Worshipful Company of Scriveners is an ancient Livery Company of the City of London. Originally known as the Mysterie of the Writers of the Court Letter and, since its incorporation, as the Master Wardens and Assistants of the Company of Scrivenors of the Cittie of London [sic], the Scriveners' Company remains one of the few City livery companies continuing to influence professional standards, namely that of scrivener notary. The Company received its first ordinances in 1373 and its royal charter was granted by King James I on 28 January 1617.

Historically, scrivener notaries were the only notaries public permitted to practise in London, the Liberties of Westminster, the Borough and other places within three miles of the City. In 1801, the British Parliament passed the Public Notaries Act confirming this status.

Scrivener notaries may be appointed after a two-year apprenticeship to a practising scrivener notary and passing the examinations as set by the Company. They must be fluent in two foreign languages and be familiar with the principles and practice of laws overseas. The ancient privilege of scrivener notaries was extinguished by the Access to Justice Act 1999, since when any notary public qualified in England and Wales may practise within the Company's former exclusive jurisdiction (i.e. Central London). Nonetheless, they remain a discrete branch of the legal profession and their unique status is recognised in civil law countries by membership of the International Union of Notaries (UINL). The current professional qualification rules were adopted by the Scriveners' Court of Assistants in 2019.

The profession of scribe has developed into public servants, authors, accountants, bookkeepers, typists and the Company further derives its membership from leading lawyers, courtiers and antiquarians.

Admission to the Freedom and Livery is, as with other City livery companies, via one of three routes: patrimony, servitude or redemption. Candidates must be proposed by two liverymen (one being a Court Assistant), or by authority of the Selection Committee. The Scriveners' Company first admitted female members in 1665.

The Company's principal activities divide into four areas: professional, charitable, civic and social. Its charitable activities are governed by its Sexcentenary Charity Fund.

In the order of precedence of the City livery companies, the Scriveners' Company ranks forty-fourth. The Scriveners' Company has produced two Lord Mayors of London: Sir Robert Clayton in 1680 and Sir James Shaw in 1805.

The Master Scrivener for 2025/26 is Mr Andrew Claudet who heads the Company including its Wardens, Assistants, Liverymen, Freemen and Apprentices.

The ancient Scriveners' Hall was burned down in the Great Fire of London (1666), being subsequently rebuilt and bought by the Coachmakers' Company in 1703. Destroyed in the Blitz, the site of its previous hall is in Noble Street, just off Gresham Street, near Guildhall, London.

== Modern status of Scrivener Notaries ==
Six scrivener notary firms are active in the City of London: Cheeswrights, De Pinna, John Newton & Sons, John Venn & Sons, Saville & Co. and Larianae Notaries.

The Worshipful Company of Scriveners is the only body from a common law jurisdiction professionally recognised by the International Union of Notaries.

=== Arms ===
Coat of arms of Worshipful Company of Scriveners
Crest On a Wreath Or and Azure, a Dexter Hand Proper holding a Pen Argent, the Sleeve Or turned up Argent, issuing from a Cloud Proper, over all a Scroll bearing the Motto "Scribite scientes" Helm That of a Gentleman Escutcheon Azure, an Eagle volant Or, holding in its beak a Penner and Inkhorn Sable stringed Gules, standing upon a Book Gules garnished Or Motto Scribite Scientes (Lat. for "Write, Ye Learned Ones")

== See also ==
- Court scribe
- Scrivener
- City of London Solicitors' Company
