= Chancery Court of York =

Ecclesiastical court of the Church of England

The Chancery Court of York is an ecclesiastical court for the Province of York of the Church of England. It receives appeals from consistory courts of dioceses within the province. The presiding officer, the Official Principal and Auditor, has been the same person as the Dean of the Arches since the nineteenth century. The court comprises the auditor, two clergy, and two laity, as for the Court of the Arches in the Province of Canterbury. The registrar is distinct, however, and is at present Louise Connacher (since 2020).

Original jurisdiction was formerly exercised by a separate provincial court, known as the Court of Audience. It was presided over by the auditor. This court was merged in the Chancery Court of York in the eighteenth century.

The Provincial Registrar of York is appointed by the archbishop, after consultation with the Standing Committee of the General Synod. There may be a deputy provincial registrar. The provincial registrar acts as legal advisor to the archbishop, registrar of the provincial court, and joint registrar of the General Synod.

== Auditors ==
- Morag Ellis, 2020–present
- Charles George, 2009–2020
- Sheila Cameron, 2000–2009
- Sir John Owen, 1980–2000
- Kenneth Elphinstone, 1977–1980
- Sir Harold Kent, 1972–1976
- Walter Wigglesworth, 1971–1972
- Sir Henry Willink, 1955–1971
- Sir Philip Wilbraham-Baker, 1934–1955
- Sir Lewis Dibdin, 1903–1934
- Sir Arthur Charles, 1898–1903
- Lord Penzance, 1875–1899
