= Robert Aylett =

English poet (1583? – 1655)

Robert Aylett (Aylet) (1583? – 1655) was an English lawyer and religious poet.

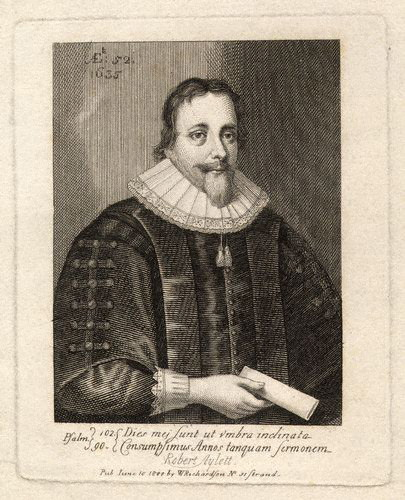
Robert Aylett, engraving of 1800 after Thomas Cross.

== Life ==
He was a son of Leonard Aylett and Ann Pater of Rivenhall, Essex born in 1582 or 3 and was educated at Trinity Hall, Cambridge, graduating B.A. in 1605, M.A. in 1608, and LL.D in 1614. He married three times but had no children: his first wife is not named but according to his 1653 poem A Wife not readymade but bespoke, by Dicus the Batchelor, and made up for him by his fellow shepheard Tityrus; in four pastoral eclogues died soon after the marriage; his second wife was Judith Gael, of Hadleigh in Suffolk, and his third, a widow, Penelope Stevens, originally Penelope Wiseman.

Living at Feering, he acted for the archdeacon of Colchester and as justice of the peace. He also acted in Essex as commissary for the Bishop of London, and judge of the Commissary Court; he played a large part in enforcing the Laudian reforms in the county. He became Master of the Faculties in 1642. He acted first for the House of Commons and then for the House of Lords until his death in 1655.

== Works ==
As a poet his work is related to George Herbert's, but he borrowed quite heavily from Edmund Spenser. Susanna, or the Arraignment of the Two Unjust Elders; was published in 1622. Joseph, or Pharaoh's Favorite, Peace with her Four Gardens (1622) and Thrift's Equipage (1622) are other earlier works.

Divine and Moral Speculations (1654) was dedicated to Henry Pierrepont, 1st Marquess of Dorchester and his wife. A Wife not readymade but bespoke, by Dicus the Batchelor, and made up for him by his fellow shepheard Tityrus; in four pastoral eclogues (1653) is a secular piece.

He died on March 15, 1655 and is buried inside the parish church of Great Braxted with an elaborate monument constructed by his younger nephew, John Aylett.
