= John Lambe (Dean of the Arches) =

English jurist

Sir John Lambe (1566? – 1647) was an English jurist, closely associated with the ecclesiastical policy of William Laud.

== Life ==
He was probably born about 1566, graduated B.A. at St. John's College, Cambridge, in 1587, and M.A. in 1590. In the interval he made a pilgrimage to Rome. On his return to England he was undermaster in a school, and studied the civil and canon law. In 1600 he purchased the registrarship of the diocese of Ely; in 1602 he was admitted a member of the College of Advocates. About the same time he was appointed co-registrar, and shortly afterwards chancellor of the diocese of Peterborough. Thomas Dove, bishop of Peterborough, made him his vicar, official, and commissary general, jointly with Henry Hickman, on 10 June 1615. In the following year he took the degree of LL.D. at Cambridge.

In 1617 he was appointed by the dean and chapter of Lincoln commissary of their peculiars in the counties of Northampton, Rutland, Huntingdon, and Leicester. He had now established a reputation as an ecclesiastical lawyer, and in 1619 he was consulted by John Williams, dean of Salisbury, in reference to some delicate cases. A strong supporter of the royal prerogative, he carried matters with a high hand against the Puritans in Northamptonshire, compelling them to attend church regularly on the Sunday, to observe holy days, and to contribute to church funds, imposing penances on recusants, and commuting them for fines, and holding courts by preference at inconvenient times and places, fining those who failed to appear. In 1621 the mayor and corporation of Northampton presented a petition to parliament complaining of these grievances, and the speaker issued his warrant for the examination of witnesses. The king, however, intervened to stop the proceedings, and during his progress through Northamptonshire knighted Lambe on 26 July at Castle Ashby. In 1623 Lambe was selected by Williams, now bishop of Lincoln, to be his commissary; but Williams in 1626 refused to sanction some proceedings proposed by Lambe against some Leicestershire conventiclers. Lambe secretly informed the privy council against him. No immediate steps were taken against the bishop, but Lambe's information and the evidence were preserved for possible future use.

Lambe was a member of the high commission court from 1629 until its abolition by the Long Parliament, and was one of Laud's most active supporters throughout that period. In the autumn of 1633 he succeeded Sir Henry Marten as dean of the arches in the court of Canterbury. On 25 February 1635 he was appointed commissary of the archdeaconries of Leicestershire and Buckinghamshire. In 1637 he was commissioned to exercise ecclesiastical jurisdiction within the county of Leicester during the suspension of Bishop Williams. On 26 January 1640 he was appointed chancellor and keeper of the great seal to Queen Henrietta Maria. Lambe investigated precedents for the queen's council, which administered her jointure income.

As the Long Parliament met, the parishioners of Waddesdon, Buckinghamshire, whom he had compelled to maintain two organs and an organist, petitioned for redress, and on 1 February 1641 Lambe was summoned to appear before a committee of the House of Commons to answer the charge. He made default, was sent for 'as a delinquent,' and on 22 February was produced at the bar in a poor state. He made formal submission on 6 March, and was released on bail. At the same time he was harassed by proceedings in the House of Lords by the widow of one of the churchwardens of Colchester, whom he had excommunicated in 1635 for refusing to rail in the altar, and by a certain Walter Walker, whom he had unlawfully deprived of the office of commissary of Leicester. The house found both charges proved, and awarded £100 to the widow and £1,250 to Walker; and it was contemplated to impeach Lambe along with Laud. He fled to Oxford, where he was incorporated on 9 December 1643. His property was sequestrated. He died according to Anthony Wood in early 1647.

== Family ==
Lambe had two daughters, both considered beauties, one of whom married Robert Sibthorpe; the other, Barbara, was second wife of Basil Feilding, afterwards Earl of Denbigh.
