= Sheila Cameron (barrister) =

British lawyer (1934–2025)

Sheila Cameron CBE KC

Dean of Arches
- In office 2001–2009
- Preceded by: Sir John Owen
- Succeeded by: Charles George

Vicar-General of the Province of Canterbury
- In office 1983–2005
- Preceded by: Michael Bradley Goodman
- Succeeded by: Timothy Briden

Personal details
- Born: 22 March 1934
- Died: 2 July 2025 (aged 91)

Sheila Morag Clark Cameron CBE KC (22 March 1934 – 2 July 2025) was a British lawyer. She was Dean of the Arches and Official Principal of the Arches Court of Canterbury from 2000 to 2009, and was therefore the senior ecclesiastical judge of the Church of England in that period. From 1983 until 2005 she was Vicar-General of Canterbury.

== Early life and education ==
Cameron was the daughter of Sir James Clark Cameron and Lady Irene M. Cameron, and was educated at the Commonweal Lodge School, Purley and St Hugh's College, Oxford where she graduated MA. In 2008, she received an LLM in Canon Law from Cardiff University.

== Career and honours ==
Cameron was called to the Bar by the Middle Temple in 1957, and was awarded the Harmsworth Law Scholarship in 1958. She took silk in 1983 and was elected as Bencher of the Middle Temple in 1988.

As a barrister, Cameron practiced family law for around 20 years. After she was appointed Queen's Counsel, she specialised in planning law, particularly regarding commons and town and village greens. This work involved active roles in public inquiries and parliamentary committees. Her longest planning inquiry was that into Terminal 5 at Heathrow, which she attended for three years on behalf of nine local authorities.

She held various public offices throughout her career, particularly in ecclesiastical law, in which she was a pioneer for women. In 1969, she was appointed Chancellor of Chemlsford, making her the first woman Diocesan Chancellor in the Church of England. In 1983, she became the first woman Vicar-General of the Province of Canterbury. In 2001, she was appointed Dean of the Arches, and Auditor of the Chancery Court of York, again being the first woman in these roles. From 1983 to 2009 she was a legal member of the General Synod. From 2010 to 2019, she served as President of the Ecclesiastical Law Society.

In 2002 she earned a Lambeth DCL and was appointed a CBE in the 2004 Birthday Honours. In 2022, she was appointed to the Order of St Richard.

== Personal life and death ==
In 1960, Cameron married fellow lawyer Gerard Charles Ryan, and they had two sons. She died on 2 July 2025, at the age of 91.
