= Deed of change of name =

Form of legal document in the UK, Ireland and Hong Kong

A deed of change of name is a legal document used in the United Kingdom, Ireland and some other countries with legal systems based on English common law, to record an intended change of name by a person or family. It is one use of a deed poll.

Some organisations, such as government departments issuing passports and driving licences, may not recognise a name change without a deed poll. However, an official document is not a legal requirement for a valid name change in common law.

== Legal procedure ==
=== United Kingdom ===
In England and Wales, such a deed may be registered in the Central Office of the High Court. Deeds so registered are advertised in The London Gazette. A deed poll can also be used to change a child's name, as long as everyone with parental responsibility for the child consents to it and the child does not object to it. A deed of name change on behalf of a minor must be approved by the Senior Master on behalf of the Master of the Rolls who will take into account the child's best interests.

Registration of deeds is regulated by the Enrolment of Deeds (Change of Name) Regulations 1994 (SI 1994/604) (as amended). Compared to some other European countries, for example Germany, a name change in the UK is easy and virtually unrestricted regarding choice.

Registration of a deed of change of name is not a legal requirement in the United Kingdom. A standard legal document, with stock wording, filled in by the person making the deed poll, and signed in presence of a witness, carries sufficient legal authority to be recognised. The witness need not be a solicitor, but can be anyone over the age of 18 independent of the person changing their name.

The procedure, requirements and law surrounding the issue in Northern Ireland are similar to those in England and Wales.

In England, Northern Ireland and Wales, a deed of change of name will not change the name on a birth certificate. For instance, when applying for a passport, both the certificate and the deed would need to be presented as documents of identity. In Northern Ireland, for children between the ages of two and eighteen years, only one change of forenames and one change of surname may be recorded. In Scotland, it is also possible to record a change of name on the original birth register entry at the General Register Office. However, only one change of forename and three changes of surname are permitted.

This restriction does not apply to transgender people who have a Gender Recognition Certificate, as a new entry in the Gender Recognition Register bearing one's new name and acquired gender is established by the General Register Office, and all subsequent birth certificates are issued from that register.

=== Republic of Ireland ===
In the Republic of Ireland, a deed poll of change of name (Irish: Athrú Ainm de réir Gníomhais Aonpháirtí) is obtainable from the Central Office of the Four Courts, Dublin at a cost of €30. Like in the UK, there are very few restrictions on name changes. One is that foreign nationals must also obtain a change of name licence from the Irish Naturalisation and Immigration Service. One of Ireland's most noted name changers was the politician Seán Loftus, who repeatedly added middle names referring to his political views so that they would appear on election ballot papers.

=== Hong Kong ===
In Hong Kong, a deed poll of change of name needs to be signed in the presence of a Hong Kong solicitor and submitted to one of the Registration of Persons Offices together with the relevant forms for a name change to be approved. There are very few restrictions on name changes, including that the new name cannot exceed six Chinese characters or 60 English characters. Like in the United Kingdom, a deed poll used to change a child's name needs to be signed by everyone with parental responsibility for the child.

== History ==
In re Parrott, Cox v Parrott [1946] Ch 183, Justice Harry Vaisey stated that he did not believe that a deed poll could be used to change a person's Christian name if given in a baptismal ceremony – that could be done only by an act of Parliament. Deeds that change a person's first name can be registered by the applicant in the Enrolment Books of the Senior Courts of England and Wales, which is located within the Royal Courts of Justice on Strand, London, and they are usually endorsed "Notwithstanding the decision of Mr Justice Vaisey in re Parrott, Cox v Parrott, the applicant wishes the enrolment to proceed".
