= Morag Ellis =

Morag Ellis KC

Dean of Arches
- Incumbent
- Assumed office 2020
- Preceded by: Charles George

Rosalind Morag Ellis, KC (born 5 June 1962) was appointed Dean of the Arches on 8 June 2020, making her the senior ecclesiastical judge of the Church of England.

Ellis was called to the bar at Gray's Inn in 1984 and has been Queen's Counsel since 2006.

Her practice is based at the Francis Taylor Building in the Inner Temple.
