= Owen P. Thompson =

American judge (1852–1933)

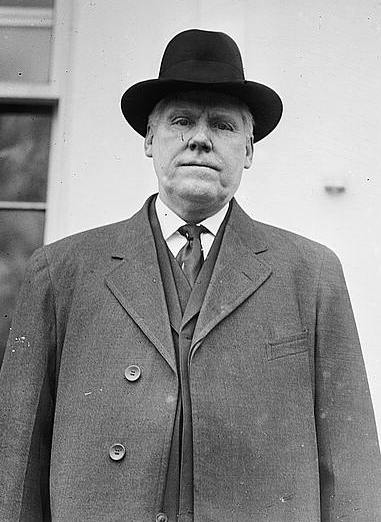
- Thompson in 1913

Personal details
- Born: Owen Pierce Thompson; February 3, 1852 Morgan County, Illinois, U.S.
- Died: August 30, 1933 (aged 81) Jacksonville, Illinois, U.S.
- Resting place: Diamond Grove Cemetery, Jacksonville, Illinois, U.S.
- Party: Democratic
- Spouse: Elizabeth Ruddick (m. 1883)
- Children: 3
- Education: Albany Law School
- Occupation: Judge

Owen Pierce Thompson (February 3, 1852 – August 30, 1933) was a judge of the Seventh Judicial District of Illinois and a delegate to the 1904 Democratic National Convention. He also served on the Illinois State Utilities Commission.

== Biography ==
Thompson was born in Morgan County, Illinois, on February 3, 1852, the eighth and youngest child of James B. Thompson and Mary Meguier. He attended the local schools, the completed the course of instruction for schoolteachers at Illinois Normal Institute in Normal, Illinois.

After receiving his teaching qualification, Thompson taught school for four years. He then began attendance at Albany Law School, from which he graduated in 1876. He was admitted to the bar and settled in Jacksonville, Illinois, where he began a practice. In 1886, Thompson was elected judge of Morgan County, Illinois, and he was reelected in 1890. In 1897, Thompson was elected judge of the Seventh Judicial District. He served until 1912, when he resigned to accept appointment to the Illinois Commerce Commission.

Thompson died in Jacksonville on August 30, 1933. He was buried at Diamond Grove Cemetery in Jacksonville.

== Family ==
In 1883, Thompson married Elizabeth Ruddick of Jacksonville. They were the parents of three children: Mary, Paul, and Irene.
