= Excommunicato interdictur omnis actus legitimus, ita quod agere non potest, nec aliquem convenire, licet ipse ab aliis possit conveniri =

Excommunicato interdictur omnis actus legitimus, ita quod agere non potest, nec aliquem convenire, licet ipse ab aliis possit conveniri was formerly the law prohibiting an excommunicated person from acting, or suing any person, but could be sued by others.

Edward Coke expounded this law in the following terms: Excommunicato interdictur omnis actus legitimus, ita quod agere non potest, nec aliquem convenire, licet ipse ab aliis possit conveniri.
