= Commission of Review =

Ad hoc court of the Church of England

A Commission of Review is an ad hoc court of the Church of England.

A Commission of Review may be appointed by the monarch on the petition of an appellant to hear appeals from the Court for Ecclesiastical Causes Reserved in matters of doctrine, ritual or ceremony; and formerly from the Commissions of Convocation. This would comprise three judges of the Supreme Court or members of the supplementary panel of former judges under section 39 of the Constitutional Reform Act 2005 (being communicants) and 2 Lords Spiritual sitting as Lords of Parliament. If doctrine is in issue the Commission sits with five advisers chosen from panels of theologians appointed jointly by the Upper House of each of the Convocations of Canterbury and York.
