= Arthur Charles (judge) =

British lawyer and High Court judge

The Right Honourable Sir Arthur Charles
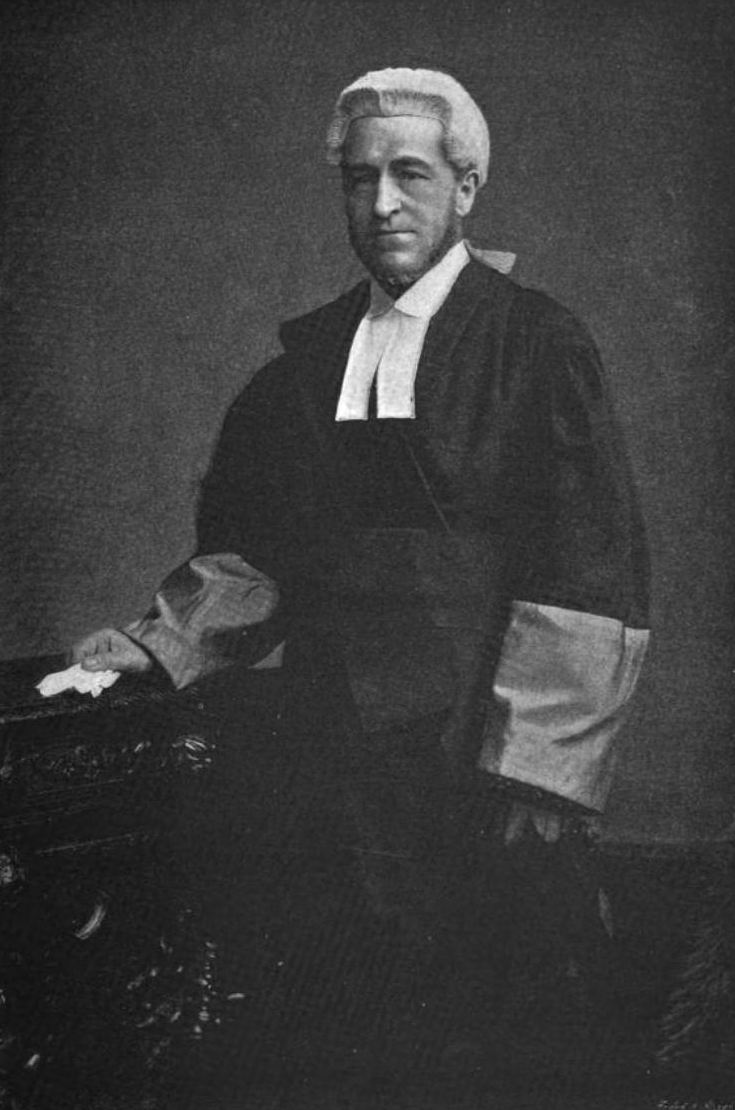
- In The Sketch, 13 May 1896

Justice of the High Court
- In office 8 September 1887 – 21 March 1897
- Preceded by: Sir William Robert Grove
- Succeeded by: Sir Edward Ridley

Personal details
- Born: 23 January 1839
- Died: 20 November 1921 (aged 82) Sevenoaks, Kent
- Spouse: Rachel Christian Newton (m. 1866)
- Children: 4
- Education: University College London

Sir Arthur Charles (23 January 1839 – 20 November 1921) was a British lawyer and High Court judge. A distinguished ecclesiastical lawyer, Charles is today best remembered for presiding over the first trial of Oscar Wilde for gross indecency.

== Early life and career ==
Charles was educated at University College School and University College London, where he read Mathematics. He was called to the bar at the Inner Temple in 1862. He began his career as a law reporter, reporting on the Court of Exchequer.

His career at the bar was associated with ecclesiastical cases. As a junior, he appeared in many cases concerning ritualist controversies. In 1868, he appeared as a junior for Mr Charles, who was being tried in the Arches Court with Alexander Mackonochie for ritual practices, and remained involved with subsequent litigation. In 1874, he defended Mackonochie on new charges. Mackonochie subsequently refused to obey the order which Arches Court made against him, leading to his suspension for three years. Charles applied to the Queen's Bench Division for a writ of prohibition against the Arches Court on the grounds the latter had exceeded its authority: the application was denied by Cockburn CJ and Mellor J, against the dissent of Lush J.

Charles became a Queen's Counsel in 1877, and unsuccessfully contested the London University constituency as a Conservative in 1880. He was Recorder of Bath between 1878–87, Chancellor of Southwell Diocese between 1884–87, Commissary of Westminster between 1884–87.

== Judicial career ==
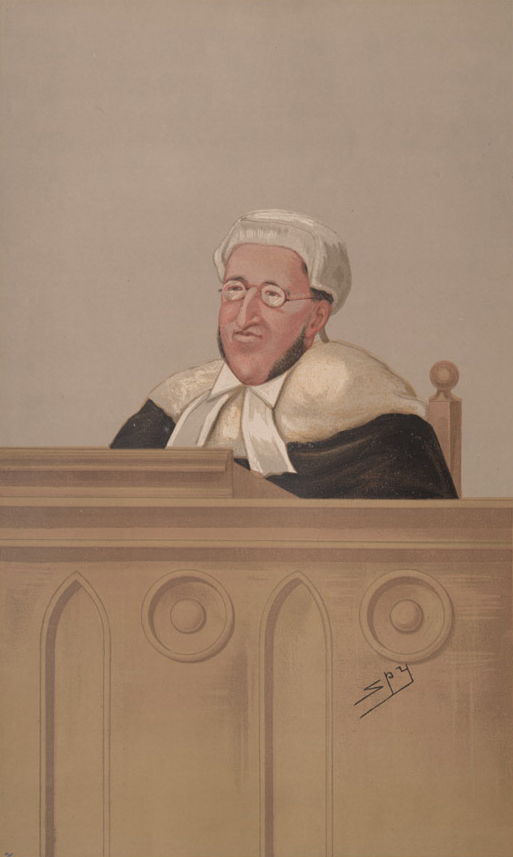
Caricature in Vanity Fair

He was appointed a Justice of the High Court of Justice in 1887 and assigned to the Queen's Bench Division, receiving the customary knighthood. In April 1895, Oscar Wilde was tried for sodomy and gross indecency for the first time before him. H. Montgomery Hyde described Charles' summing-up as "a fine example of judicial impartiality", although others were more critical. In the end, the jury was unable to agree, and Wilde was tried again and convicted the following month before Mr Justice Wills.

He resigned in 1897 for health reasons and was sworn of the Privy Council, but did not sit on the Judicial Committee. In 1899 he became Dean of the Arches, Master of the Faculties, and Auditor of the Chancery Court of York, succeeding to Lord Penzance, in front of whom Charles had often appeared at the bar. After the ritualist controversies of previous decades, Charles presided over the ecclesiastical courts during a period of relative quiet. He retired in 1903.

== Family ==
Charles married Rachel Christian, daughter of T. D. Newton, in 1866; they had three sons and a daughter. His son Sir Ernest Bruce Charles also became a High Court judge.
