= Sea protest =

Statement in maritime law

In maritime law, a sea protest is a notarized statement obtained after a ship enters port after a rough voyage. Its purpose is to protect the ship's charterer or owner from liability for damage to the cargo, the ship or to other ships in a collision, where this was caused by the perils of the sea (for example, bad weather).

If it is known or suspected that such damage has occurred, the captain will make a sworn "protest in common form" at the office of a notary public, or a consul. If the full extent of any damage caused only becomes apparent while or after the cargo is unloaded, the captain may return to the office of the notary public to extend their protest. If a sea protest is not made, the owner or charterer may be liable for the damage caused and may be unable to produce the ship's log (which would have recorded the relevant incidents) as evidence in court.
