= Tudor Owen (judge) =

British Circuit judge (born 1951)

Tudor Wyn Owen (born 16 May 1951) is a British Circuit judge.

He was educated at Aberdare Boys' Grammar School and King's College London (LLB). He was called to the bar at Gray's Inn in 1974 and served as a Recorder from 1991 to 2007.

== Controversy ==
In early 2020, Judge Owen was alleged to have been involved in an incident with a cyclist, where the cyclist recorded a man believed to be Judge Owen using his mobile phone when driving a blue Mercedes, subsequently the cyclist alleged that the man purported to be Owen attempted to cause injury to the cyclist by braking improperly, it was also subsequently noted by viewers that the Mercedes driver was also not wearing a seat-belt. The incident was recorded on video and as at April 2020 had been viewed several thousand times. https://www.newsflare.com/video/123378/crime-accidents/suspected-crown-court-judge-brake-checks-cyclist
