= Lewis Dibdin =

English ecclesiastical lawyer (1852–1938)

Sir Lewis Tonna Dibdin KC (19 July 1852 – 12 June 1938) was an ecclesiastical lawyer and Dean of the Arches.

He was born the third son of the Rev. Robert W. Dibdin, of St. Giles's, London and went to St John's College, Cambridge.

He trained for the law in Lincoln's Inn, was made KC (King's Counsel) in 1901 and gradually acquired a large Chancery practice. He established a reputation as an ecclesiastical lawyer and took part in some leading ecclesiastical cases. In 1903 he was knighted and appointed Dean of the Arches. He was appointed First Church Estates Commissioner in 1905, holding that office until 1931. He sat the Royal Commission on Divorce between 1909 and 1912 and held the post of Vicar-General of the Province of Canterbury from 1925 to 1934, when he retired.

He died in 1938 and was buried St. John's Church, Dormansland, Surrey. He had married Marianne Aubrey, daughter of the late Rev. H.S. Pinder. They had three sons and two daughters.

Legal offices
Preceded by Sir Arthur Charles	Dean of the Arches; 1903–1934	Succeeded by Sir Philip Baker Wilbraham
Church of England titles
Preceded by The Earl Stanhope	First Church Estates Commissioner; 1905–1931	Succeeded by Sir George Middleton
