= John Owen (judge) =

British barrister and judge (1925–2010)

Sir John Arthur Dalziel Owen (22 November 1925 – 9 December 2010) was a British barrister and High Court judge. He has been described as "one of the foremost criminal judges of his time".

== Biography ==
Born in Stockport, John Owen was the son of R. J. Owen and Mrs O. B. Owen. His sister is Joan Seccombe, Baroness Seccombe. He came from a legal background: both of his grandfathers and his uncle were lawyers. He was educated at Solihull School, then went to Brasenose College, Oxford, before being called up for military service during the Second World War. After a brief stint in the Royal Navy, he was commissioned into the 2nd King Edward VII's Own Gurkha Rifles, and served in India in the run-up to Partition.

Returning to Brasenose in 1947, he read Law and graduated MA and BCL (1949), and obtained a half-blue in athletics. Owen was called to the Bar by Gray's Inn in 1951, and joined the Midland and Oxford Circuit. Practicing from Arthur Evan James’s chambers in Temple Row, Birmingham, Owen built a mixed practice, but was predominantly engaged in criminal work. He became a Queen's Counsel in 1970, and joined Michael Davis QC's chambers at Harcourt Buildings, Temple.

He was a Deputy Chairman of Warwickshire Quarter Sessions from 1967 to 1971 and a Recorder from 1972 to 1984. He was elected a Bencher of Gray's Inn in 1980, and was Deputy Leader of Midland and Oxford Circuit from 1980 to 1984. He was also a member of the Senate of the Inns of Court and the Bar from 1977 to 1980 and Chairman of the West Midlands Area Mental Health Review Tribunal from 1972 to 1980.

Owen was appointed a Circuit Judge sitting at the Central Criminal Court in 1984, and a Justice of the High Court in 1986. Receiving the customary knighthood, he was assigned to the Queen's Bench Division. He was Presiding Judge of the Midland and Oxford Circuit from 1988 to 1992. He retired from the High Court in 2000.

A member of the General Synod of the Church of England for many years, Owen was Chancellor of the Diocese of Derby from 1973 to 1980, of the Diocese of Coventry from 1973 to 1980, and of the Diocese of Southwell from 1979 to 1980. He was Dean of the Arches Court of Canterbury, Auditor of the Chancery Court of York, and Master of the Faculties from 1980 to 2000. In 1993, he received a Lamberth DCL. He helped to establish the first degree course in canon law in Britain since the Reformation at Cardiff University and, in retirement, obtained an LLM from the university in 1996.

== Notable cases ==
In 1973, Owen defended Father Patrick Fell, a Catholic priest accused of being an IRA commander. As a judge, in 1985, he tried the 12th Duke of Manchester for attempting fraud against the National Westminster Bank. In 1991, he was the judge at first instance in the landmark case R v R, which saw the end of the marital rape exemption. In 1992, he was a member of the Court of Appeal in R v Brown, whose decision was upheld by the House of Lords. In 2000, he tried the farmer Tony Martin for the murder of a burglar.

== Family ==
Owen married, in 1952, Valerie (née Ethell). They had two children, one son and one daughter. Their daughter, Melissa Clare Owen (born 12 November 1960), was married, from 1985 to 1997, to The Hon. Michael-John Ulick Knatchbull, a son of John Knatchbull, 7th Baron Brabourne and Patricia Knatchbull, 2nd Countess Mountbatten of Burma.
