= Philip Wilbraham Baker Wilbraham =

British ecclesiastical lawyer and administrator

Wilbraham in 1925.

Sir Philip Wilbraham Baker Wilbraham, 6th Baronet, KBE (17 September 1875 – 11 October 1957) was a British ecclesiastical lawyer and administrator.

== Biography ==
Wilbraham was born at Rode Hall, Cheshire, the son of Sir George Barrington Baker Wilbraham, 5th Baronet, and of Katharine Frances Wilbraham, daughter of General Sir Richard Wilbraham. He was also a descendant of Sir George Baker, 1st Baronet. Wilbraham was educated at Harrow School and Balliol College, Oxford. He was elected a fellow of All Souls College, Oxford in 1899. He married Joyce Christabel Kennaway, daughter of Sir John Kennaway, 3rd Baronet, in 1901.

Wilbraham joined the chambers of Charles Sargant and was called to the bar by Lincoln's Inn in 1901. Specialising in ecclesiastical law, he was appointed Chancellor of the diocese of Chester in 1913, Chancellor and Vicar-General of York in 1915, Chancellor of the diocese of Truro in 1923, of Chelmsford in 1928, and of Durham in 1929. He held these offices until 1934 he was appointed Dean of the Arches, Master of the Faculties, and Vicar-General of the province of Canterbury, and auditor of the Chancery Court of York, retiring in 1955.

Wilbraham was an original member and served as the first secretary of the Church Assembly from 1920 to 1939, when he was appointed First Church Estates Commissioner. He retired from the post and was appointed a KBE in the 1954 Birthday Honours.

Church of England titles
Preceded by Sir George Middleton	First Church Estates Commissioner; 1939–1954	Succeeded by Sir Malcolm Trustram Eve
Baronetage of Great Britain
Preceded by Philip Baker Wilbraham	Baronet (of Loventor); 1912–1957	Succeeded by Randle Baker Wilbraham
