= Dean of the Arches =

Judge of the English ecclesiastical court

The Dean of the Arches is the judge who presides in the provincial ecclesiastical court of the Archbishop of Canterbury. (Note: Details of that court's responsibilities: Ecclesiastical court#Church of England) This court is called the Arches Court of Canterbury. It hears appeals from consistory courts and bishop's disciplinary tribunals in the province of Canterbury.

The Dean of the Arches is appointed jointly by the Archbishop of Canterbury and the Archbishop of York with the approval of the monarch signified by warrant under the sign manual. The same person presides in the Chancery Court of York where he or she has the title of Auditor and hears appeals from consistory courts and bishop's disciplinary tribunals in the province of York. The Dean of the Arches is also Official Principal of the Archbishop of Canterbury and the Archbishop of York, and acts as Master of the Faculties to the Archbishop of Canterbury.

The current dean of the Arches is Morag Ellis, who succeeded Charles George on 8 June 2020.

== List of Deans of the Arches ==
Years	Dean
1273–	William de Middelton
1297–	William de Sardinia
1308–	John de Ross (?afterwards Bishop of Carlisle, 1325)
1322–?1323	John de Stratford (afterwards Bishop of Winchester, 1323)
1333	John de Ufford
c.1346	Simon Islip (afterwards Archbishop of Canterbury, 1349)
1350–	John de Carleton
1360–	William de Wittersley
1364–	Thomas Young
1376–	John Barner
1381–	Thomas de Baketon, Appointed by Archbishop Courteney (Baketon/Bakton/Bacton/Bactone and variants) Likely a member of the Mynyot/Minot family that included Thomas Minot, Archbishop of Dublin who died in London 1375 (research ongoing)
1407–	Richard Brinkley
1415–	Henry Ware
1419–	John Stafford afterwards Archdeacon of Salisbury, 1419)
1423–	Thomas Beckington (also Archdeacon of Buckingham, 1424–1443 and afterwards Bishop of Bath and Wells, 1443}
1426–	William Lyndwood (also Archdeacon of Stow, 1434)
1434–1440	John Lyndfeld
1441–	Zanobius Mulakyn (alias Naufer)
1448–	William Wytham (also Dean of Wells, 1469–1472)
1452–	Zanobius Mulakyn (alias Naufer)
1453–1454	Richard Leyte
1454–	William Spaldyng
1469–	John Boteler
1474–	John Morton (cardinal), afterwards Bishop of Ely, 1478 and Archbishop of Canterbury, 1486
1504–1515	Humphrey Hawardyn
c.1511	Richard Bodewell also known as Blodwell
1520–1522	Thomas Wodynton
?–1532	Peter Ligham
1532–1543	Richard Gwent (died 1543) (also Archdeacon of Brecon, 1534 and Archdeacon of London, 1534) and Archdeacon of Huntingdon, 1542)
1543–1545	John Cock (or Cockys) (Note: The parliamentary history of the principality of Wales, from the earliesr times to the present day, 1541–1895)
1545–	William Coke or Cooke (1st lay dean)
1549–	Griffin Leyson
1553–	John Story (afterwards MP for East Grinstead, 1553 and Bramber, 1554)
1556–1557	David Pole (afterwards Bishop of Peterborough, 1557}
1557–1558	Henry Cole
1558–1559	Nicholas Harpisfield
1559–1560	William Mowse
1560–?1567	Robert Weston (afterwards Lord Chancellor of Ireland, 1567)
1567–1573	Thomas Yale
1572–	John Cooke
1573–1589/90	Bartholomew Clerke
1590–1597	Richard Cosin
1597–1598	Thomas Byng
1598–1617	Daniel Donne
1618–1624	Sir William Bird
1624–1633	Sir Henry Marten
1633–1643	Sir John Lambe
c.1646	William Sammes
c.1647–1655	William Clerke
c.1658–	John Godolpin
c.1660	Walter Walker
c.1660	Richard Zouch
1660–1672	Sir Giles Sweit
1672–1684	Sir Robert Wiseman
1684–1686	Sir Richard Lloyd
1686–1688	Sir Thomas Exton
1689–1703	George Oxenden
1703–1710	Sir John Cooke
1710–1751	John Bettesworth
1751–1758	Sir George Lee
1758–1764	Sir Edward Simpson
1764–1778	Sir George Hay
1778–1788	Peter Calvert
1788–1809	Sir William Wynne
1809–1834	Sir John Nicholl
1834–1852	Herbert Jenner-Fust
1852–1858	Sir John Dodson
1858–1867	Stephen Lushington
1867–1875	Sir Robert Phillimore
1875–1898	Lord Penzance
1898–1903	Sir Arthur Charles
1903–1934	Sir Lewis Dibdin
1934–1955	Sir Philip Wilbraham-Baker
1955–1971	Sir Henry Willink
1971–1972	Walter Wigglesworth
1972–1976	Sir Harold Kent
1977–1980	Kenneth Elphinstone
1980–2000	Sir John Owen
2001–2009	Sheila Cameron
2009–2020	Charles George
2020–	Morag Ellis
