= Ecclesiastical Licences Act 1533 =

Act of the Parliament of England

Ecclesiastical Licences Act 1533 (Note: The citation of this act by this short title was authorised by section 5 of, and the second schedule to, the Statute Law Revision Act 1948. Due to the repeal of those provisions, it is now authorised by section 19(2) of the Interpretation Act 1978.)
- Act of Parliament
- Parliament of England
- Long title: An Acte for the exoneracion from exaccions payde to the See of Rome. (Note: These words are printed against this act in the second column of the second schedule to the Statute Law Revision Act 1948, which is headed "Title".)
- Citation: 25 Hen. 8. c. 21
- Territorial extent: England and Wales

Dates
- Royal assent: 30 March 1534
- Commencement: 15 January 1534 (Note: Start of session.)
Other legislation
Amended by	Public Notaries Act 1843; Statute Law Revision Act 1888; Statute Law Revision Act 1948; Criminal Law Act 1967; Statute Law (Repeals) Act 1969; Marriage Act 1983; Courts and Legal Services Act 1990; Constitutional Reform Act 2005
Relates to	Public Notaries Act 1843

Status: Amended

Text of statute as originally enacted

Revised text of statute as amended

Text of the Ecclesiastical Licences Act 1533 as in force today (including any amendments) within the United Kingdom, from legislation.gov.uk.

The Ecclesiastical Licences Act 1533 (25 Hen. 8. c. 21), also known as the Dispensations Act 1533, Peter's Pence Act 1533 or the Act Concerning Peter's Pence and Dispensations, is an act of the Parliament of England. It was passed by the English Reformation Parliament in the early part of 1534 and outlawed the payment of Peter's Pence and other payments to Rome. The act remained partly in force in Great Britain at the end of 2010. It is under section III of this act, that the Archbishop of Canterbury can award a Lambeth degree as an academic degree.

== History ==
Peter's Pence was originally an annual tribute of one penny from each householder owning a land of a certain value to the Pope and had been collected in England since the reign of King Alfred. In the twelfth century it was fixed at an annual sum of £200 for the whole realm. It was not the largest payment to Rome but it is argued by Stanford Lehmberg that it was deliberately mentioned in the act because it was theoretically paid by laymen and thus might have seemed more intolerable than payments affecting clerics only.

The act abolished Peter's Pence and all other payments to Rome and accorded to the Archbishop of Canterbury the power to issue dispensations formerly given by the Pope. The fees which might have been charged for the dispensations were set and required royal assent, confirmed by the Great Seal of the Realm, in matters for which the usual fee was over £4.

On the 12 March 1534 the Commons passed the bill and were possibly responsible, argues Lehmberg, for the clauses which claimed that the act should not be read as a decline from the "very articles of the catholic faith of Christendom". A clause in the bill gave the Crown the power to conduct visitations of monasteries which had been exempt from the Archbishop's jurisdiction and forbade English clergy from visiting religious assemblies abroad.

When the bill came to the Upper House some clauses were added in the second and third reading. The Bill was passed on the 20 March after the fourth reading and after the Commons assented to the new clauses immediately. On the final day of the session, however, one more clause was added: the King would have the power at any period before 24 June to abrogate the complete Act or just a section of it as he so wished. Lehmberg puts forth the idea that Henry VIII still wanted some leverage in bargaining with the Pope after the French King recently attempted to reconcile Henry with Pope Clement VII. The final clause was never used as the French mission did not succeed.

== Provisions ==
The preamble is noteworthy because it is written in the form of a petition from the Commons to the King and is one of the first mentions of a "papal usurpation" and because it reasserts the theory that England has "no superior under God, but only your Grace". It also claims that the authority of the King's "imperial crown" is diminished by "the unreasonable and uncharitable usurpations and exactions" of the Pope.

Section 5 of the act (which amongst other things had the effect of requiring faculties to be registered by the Clerk of the Crown in Chancery) does not apply in relation to any faculty granted to a public notary.

As to section 11 of the act, see section 5 of the Public Notaries Act 1843 (6 & 7 Vict. c. 90). In section 11 of the act (which relates to refusal of archbishop to grant licences etc.) any reference to the Lord Chancellor or Lord Keeper of the Great Seal (however expressed) is to be read as a reference to the Chancellor of the High Court. The Chancellor of the High Court may nominate another judge of that court to exercise his functions under this section.

== Subsequent developments ==
Section 19, 20, 22 of the act were repealed by section 1 of, and the first schedule to, the Statute Law Revision Act 1948 (11 & 12 Geo. 6. c. 62), which came into force on 30 July 1948.

The words at the end of section 7 of the act were repealed by section 4(a) of the Statute Law Revision Act 1948 (11 & 12 Geo. 6. c. 62), which came into force on 30 July 1948.

Section 16 of the act was repealed by section 13 of, and part I of schedule 4 to, the Criminal Law Act 1967, which came into force on 21 July 1967.

The preamble to, and sections 1, 2, 15, 21 and 23 of, the act were repealed by section 1 of, and part II of the schedule to, the Statute Law (Repeals) Act 1969, which came into force on 1 January 1970.

The repeal by the Statute Law (Repeals) Act 1969 of section 2 of the Act of Supremacy (1 Eliz. 1. c. 1) (1558) does not affect the continued operation, so far as unrepealed, of the Ecclesiastical Licences Act 1533.

The act was retained for the Republic of Ireland by section 2(2)(a) of, and part 4 of schedule 1 to, the Statute Law Revision Act 2007, which came into force on 8 May 2007.

== Bibliography ==
- Stanford E. Lehmberg, The Reformation Parliament, 1529 - 1536 (Cambridge University Press, 1970).
- Halsbury's Statutes
