= Consistory court =

Ecclesiastical court in the Church of England

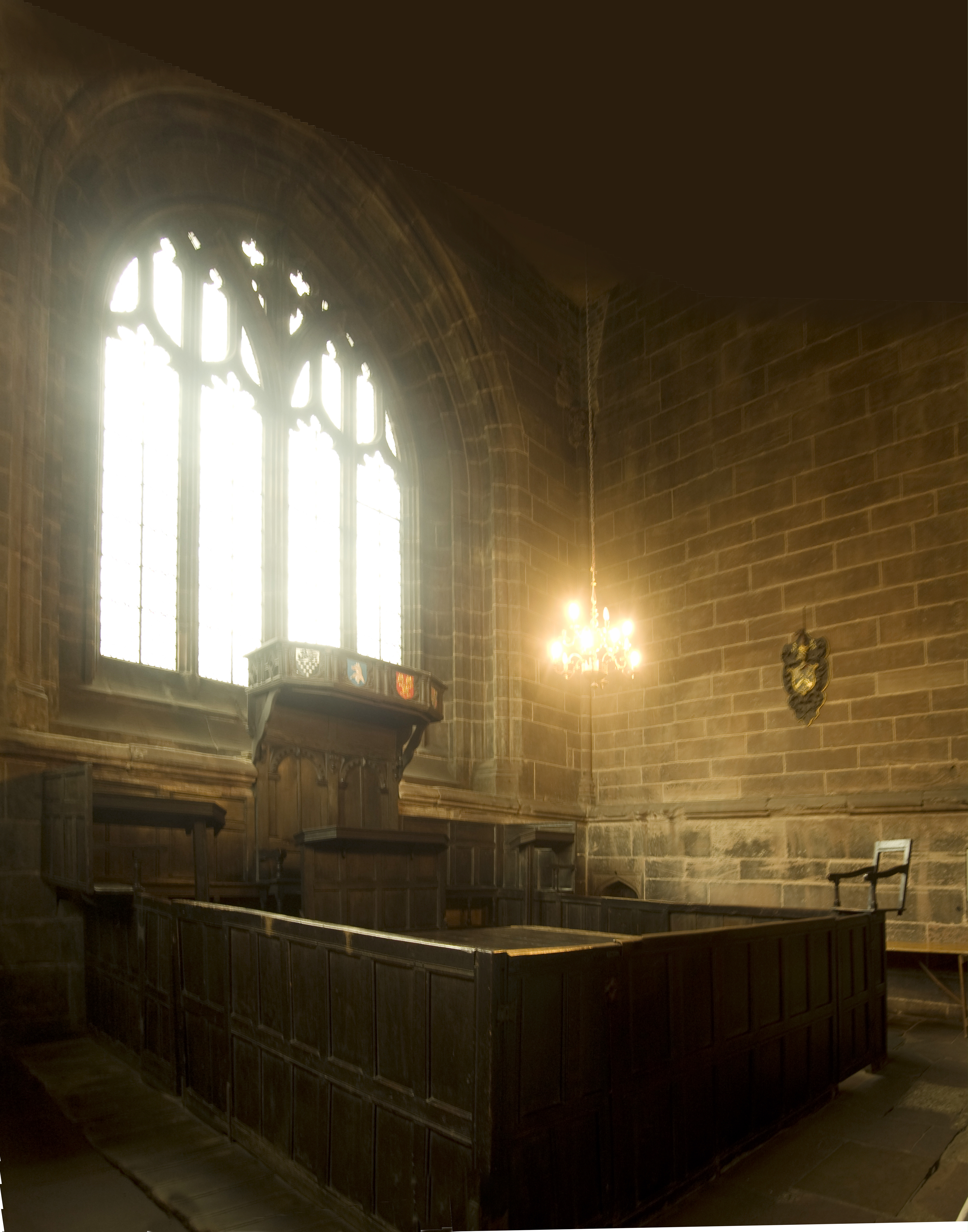
One of the oldest complete ecclesiastical courtrooms in England is the consistory court in Chester Cathedral.

A consistory court is a type of ecclesiastical court, especially within the Church of England where they were originally established pursuant to a charter of King William the Conqueror, and still exist today, although since about the middle of the 19th century consistory courts have lost much of their subject-matter jurisdiction. Each diocese in the Church of England has a consistory court (called in the Diocese of Canterbury the Commissary Court).

== History of consistory courts in England ==
Consistory courts have been in existence in England since shortly after the Norman conquest and their jurisdiction and operation was essentially unaffected by the English reformations. Originally, the jurisdiction of consistory courts was very wide indeed and covered such matters as defamation, probate, and matrimonial causes as well as a general jurisdiction over both clergy and laity in relation to matters relating to church discipline and to morality more generally and to the use and control of consecrated church property within the diocese. The judge of the consistory court, appointed by the bishop, was the bishop's official principal and vicar-general of the diocese and became known in his judicial capacity by the title "chancellor".

Appeals lay from the consistory court to the provincial court of the archbishop. In the province of Canterbury, the archbishop's court was known as the Court of Arches and was presided over by the archbishop's official principal, known as the Dean of the Arches. In the province of York, appeals lay to the Chancery Court of York presided over by the archbishop of York's official principal, the auditor. Until 1532 further appeal lay to Rome; thereafter further appeal was to the Crown.

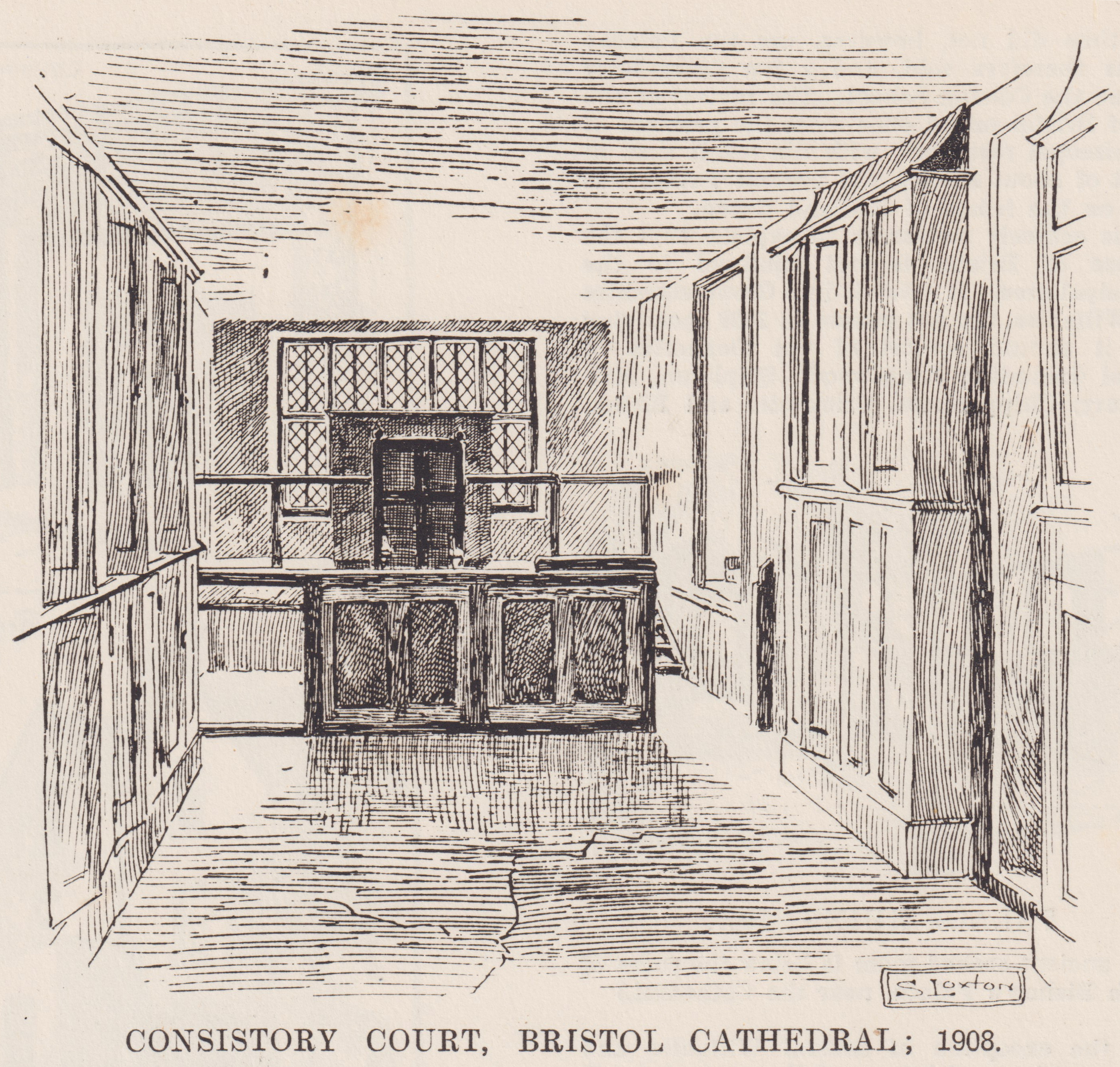
Consistory Court, Bristol Cathedral, 1908

By the end of the eighteenth century, the exercise of jurisdiction over the laity in moral matters had fallen into desuetude. But there was no reform of the jurisdiction of the ecclesiastical courts until the middle of the nineteenth century. In 1855, the defamation jurisdiction of the ecclesiastical court was brought to an end and in 1857 the probate jurisdiction was transferred to the newly created Court of Probate and the matrimonial jurisdiction to the newly created Divorce Court. Both of these new courts were temporal rather than ecclesiastical courts; but their procedure continued (as it continues to this day) to reflect the ecclesiastical origins of the jurisdiction with, for example, matrimonial proceedings being by way of petition and the "citation" of parties in probate proceedings. A major part of the jurisdiction left to the ecclesiastical courts was that which concerned the control of consecrated ecclesiastical property – essentially churches and their churchyards and certain other consecrated places such as municipal burial grounds. The other major aspect of their jurisdiction which remained was their criminal jurisdiction in relation to the clergy – i.e. their jurisdiction to deal with allegations of ecclesiastical offences against the clergy (for example for immoral conduct, neglect of duty or in relation to doctrinal or ceremonial matters). Their corrective jurisdiction over clergy was abrogated by the Church Discipline Act 1840 (3 & 4 Vict. c. 86). However, by the Clergy Discipline Act 1892 (55 & 56 Vict. c. 32), a clergyman may be prosecuted and tried in a consistory court for immoral acts or conduct. Under this act, either party may appeal to a secular court or the monarch in Council.

Following a report in 1954 from the Archbishops’ Commission on Ecclesiastical Courts, the ecclesiastical courts were put on a statutory footing by the Ecclesiastical Jurisdiction Measure 1963. (Note: A measure is a legislative instrument passed by the General Synod of the Church of England which, once it has been presented for and received the royal assent on the resolution of both houses of Parliament, has "the force and effect of an Act of Parliament": section 4, Church of England Assembly (Powers) Act 1919.) The jurisdiction of the consistory courts was not much altered by the 1963 Measure save that criminal jurisdiction over the clergy where the case involved a question of doctrine, ritual or ceremonial was transferred to a new court called the Court of Ecclesiastical Causes Reserved (which continues to have that role).

A further reform took place more recently when the Clergy Discipline Measure 2003 transferred the criminal jurisdiction over the clergy (other than in relation to matters of doctrine, ritual or ceremonial) to new "bishop's tribunals" with modern tribunal procedure and a revised scheme of statutory penalties.

== Officers of the consistory court during the early modern period ==
During the early modern period it became increasingly common for the bishop of an Anglican diocese, or the archdeacon of a rural deanery, to delegate jurisdiction of the diocesan consistory court to a chancellor, who presided over cases such as probations of estates, excommunications, underpayment of tithables, and other serious moral transgressions within the diocese. This allowed the diocesan bishop and other clergy to focus on spiritual matters and retain an advocate learned in the law to oversee the administration of the inquisitorial court cases. The chancellor typically sat on a throne at the front of the ecclesiastical courtroom, presiding over the well where the proctors and litigants would sit. The diocesan registrar would sit on a slightly lower bench to the chancellor's right, which would contain a small table allowing them to record the details of the court cases brought by the proctors, similar to a clerk in a temporal common law court.

Inside a wooden enclosure before the chancellor and registrar would typically be a round table at which the proctors and litigants would sit. In contrast with the rectilinear benches for the attorneys in a temporal English common law courtroom, the round table of the ecclesiastical courtroom symbolized that within the inquisitorial system of the anglican church, the role of proctors and litigants was to help inform the court of the truth, regardless of the best interest of whom they were hired to represent. Proctors could charge ecclesiastical litigants higher fees for cases that extended for longer amounts of time, so proctors would often ask chancellors to delay adjudication of disputes until further investigation could be conducted, allowing the proctors more time to ask for higher fees from the litigants. Often, proctors would bring cases against parishioners where no dispute previously existed, or even against the advice of clergy such as parish priests and bishop's assistants. This sometimes led to disputes between the clergy, who were more concerned with forgiving the parishioners' sins from a religious perspective, and the proctors, who were more concerned with using the absolution and punishment of sins as a mechanism to make a greater profit for the church court.

Finally, apparitors of the ecclesiastical court would ensure the appearance of ecclesiastical defendants before the chancellor and carry out some of the ecclesiastical punishments upon conviction, similar to the role of a bailiff or constable in a temporal English common law court. The apparitors would typically sit in a chair overlooking the well of the court as well as the entrance to the diocesan courtroom from the nave of the cathedral, allowing them to call litigants before the court and ensure the operation of the cases. Additionally, apparitors might also ensure the appearance of ecclesiastical defendants by overseeing the church prison for the archdeaconry, diocese, or archdiocese. They were generally paid based upon the number of summonses they served each month to litigants, although one apparitor might work for multiple dioceses or archdeaconries when the caseloads were low, or also receive a small salary for their general duties to the court in some of the larger dioceses and archdioceses.

== Jurisdiction today ==
=== Status and powers of consistory courts ===
Consistory courts are the King's courts with the ultimate appellate authority being either His Majesty in Council (i.e. the Privy Council) or a Commission of Review directed by His Majesty under the Great Seal.

They are superior courts in the sense that it need not appear in any proceedings or judgements of a consistory court that the court was acting within its jurisdiction; but they are inferior courts in the sense that they can be stopped from exceeding their jurisdiction by a prohibiting order granted on judicial review.

A consistory court has the same powers as the High Court in relation to the attendance and examination of witnesses and the production and inspection of documents.

If any person does or omits to do anything in connection with proceedings before, or with an order made by, a consistory court that constitutes contempt of the consistory court, that person is liable to be punished by the High Court as if that person had been guilty of contempt of the High Court.

=== Matters within the consistory courts' jurisdiction ===
The consistory court of a diocese has jurisdiction to hear and determine:

- proceedings for obtaining a faculty to authorise an act relating to land in the diocese, or to something on, in or otherwise appertaining to land there, for which a faculty is required;
- proceedings for an order under section 53(8) of the Ecclesiastical Jurisdiction and Care of Churches Measure 2018 (delivery of article to place of safety);
- proceedings for obtaining a faculty under section 67 of the 2018 Measure (sale of books in parochial library);
- proceedings for an injunction under section 71 or a restoration order under section 72 of the 2018 Measure;
- proceedings under section 68(7) or (12) of the Mission and Pastoral Measure 2011 (enforcement or interpretation of leases);
- proceedings under section 71(9) of that Measure (compensation for loss of burial rights);
- proceedings upon a jus patronatus (Note: A jus patronatus is a process instituted by the bishop, if he so thinks fit, at the request of either of the parties claiming to be patrons of a benefice in certain circumstances, or either of the clergymen presented by them, or if he has a doubt as to the title of the patron claiming to present.) awarded by the bishop of the diocese;
- any other proceedings which, immediately before the passing of the Ecclesiastical Jurisdiction Measure 1963 on 31 July 1963, the court had power to determine (except proceedings the jurisdiction for which was expressly abolished by that measure).

=== Faculty jurisdiction ===
The exercise of the faculty jurisdiction forms the very great majority of the work of the consistory courts today – the rest of the statutory jurisdiction being largely concerned with rather technical matters of ecclesiastical law and only rarely invoked.

As a general rule, land and buildings become subject to the jurisdiction of the consistory court by virtue of being consecrated by the bishop of the diocese. In the case of more recently built churches there will be a formal record of consecration; in the case of ancient churches, there is a legal presumption that they have been consecrated. All parish churches, and certain other buildings and land even though not consecrated, are subject to the faculty jurisdiction. The consecrated parts of municipal cemeteries are subject to the faculty jurisdiction.

A faculty is required for any material alteration in such a church or its churchyard.

A faculty is required for the disturbance or removal of human remains that have been buried in consecrated land; it is a criminal offence to remove a body from consecrated land without the authority of a faculty.

The jurisdiction also extends to all the goods appertaining to such a church, as well as to its fabric and any fittings annexed to the realty, and also to the churchyard.

It is because of the existence of the faculty jurisdiction that the "ecclesiastical exemption" from listed building control (Note: See: "Planning (Listed Buildings and Conservation Areas) Act 1990: Section 60", legislation.gov.uk, The National Archives, 1990 c. 9 (s. 60); "The Ecclesiastical Exemption (Listed Buildings and Conservation Areas) (England) Order 2010", legislation.gov.uk, The National Archives, SI 2010/1176) is provided for in heritage protection legislation, Parliament having taken the view that there was already in place, in relation to the buildings and land of the Church of England that were in ecclesiastical use, a satisfactory legal regime controlling their use and alteration. (The benefit of the exemption is extended under the current heritage protection legislation to the buildings of other denominations who have satisfied the Secretary of State that they have established adequate regimes for preserving the historic and architectural character of their listed ecclesiastical buildings.) Much of the work of the consistory courts today involves applying principles of ecclesiastical law to applications ("petitions") for faculties to make alterations to listed church buildings. Those legal principles have been developed in recent years expressly to take account of the desirability of preserving the historic and architectural character of the church's listed buildings but in such a way that the needs – particularly those that relate to the mission of the church – are fully taken into account in determining faculty petitions that seek the making of changes to listed churches. The criteria to be adopted by consistory courts when considering proposals for the alteration of churches which are listed buildings under the Planning (Listed Buildings and Conservation Areas) Act 1990 are set out in Re St Alkmund, Duffield [2013] Fam 158, a decision of the Arches Court of Canterbury.

== Judge ==
Each Consistory court is presided over by a single judge who is styled the Chancellor of the Diocese (or in Canterbury the Commissary-General).

The chancellor is appointed by the bishop of the diocese by letters patent on the recommendation of the Dean of the Arches and Auditor.

Ecclesiastical jurisdiction in the diocese, both contentious and voluntary, is committed to the Chancellor under two separate offices, those of official principal and vicar-general: the distinction between the two offices is that the official principal usually exercises contentious jurisdiction and the vicar-general voluntary jurisdiction.

A person is eligible for appointment as chancellor only if the person holds or has held high judicial office, holds or has held the office of circuit judge, or has the qualifications required for holding the office of circuit judge. A lay person must be a communicant of the Church of England to be eligible. The chancellor takes the judicial oath, the oath of allegiance. The chancellor may be removed by the bishop only if the Upper House of the Convocation of the province resolves that he or she is incapable of acting or unfit to act.

Chancellors are addressed on the bench as "Worshipful Sir" or "Sir" and are styled "The Worshipful".

When sitting, chancellors wear the same black silk gown that was formerly worn by judges in the Chancery Division of the High Court and by certain other judges, with a short wig, collar and bands. On ceremonial occasions chancellors wear a full-bottomed wig and the silk gown is worn over a court coat, court waistcoat with lace jabot and knee breeches, silk stockings and patent leather pumps with buckles.

The consistory court itself is styled "this venerable court". Most have a mace, carried by the apparitor, who is usually a member of the staff of the diocesan registry and who was historically the official who served the processes of the court and caused defendants to appear by summons.

There may also be a deputy chancellor who may exercise the court's jurisdiction in the same way as the chancellor. In order to be appointed a deputy chancellor a person must have the qualifications required to be appointed a chancellor.

== Procedure ==
The procedure to be followed by the court and by parties in faculty proceedings are set out in the Faculty Jurisdiction Rules 2015.

The consistory court usually sits "on paper" without formal hearings. Contentious cases can be determined on consideration of written representations if the chancellor considers it expedient and all the parties agree.

When hearings are required they can be held in any convenient building; which might be the church to which the proceedings relate or an existing court building or a school or community hall made available for the purpose. Historically some consistory courts were housed in the cathedral church of the diocese and some cathedrals still contain court rooms, although these are now used for other purposes. For example, the former consistory court at St Paul's Cathedral is now the Chapel of the Order of St. Michael and St. George. One of the oldest surviving complete ecclesiastical courtrooms in Great Britain is the consistory court at Chester Cathedral. Probably the oldest known example (1617) is in the Chapel of St Nicholas, King's Lynn, Norfolk.

Until the latter part of the nineteenth century there were legal practitioners in England known as "advocates" who practised solely in ecclesiastical and admiralty law and formed a chartered institution called Doctors' Commons. After the transfer of much of the jurisdiction of the ecclesiastical courts to new, temporal courts in the 1850s, Doctors’ Commons declined and was eventually closed. Thereafter, counsel (i.e. barristers) were permitted to appear in the ecclesiastical courts and nowadays solicitors also appear. The only limitation that exists in relation to representation is the issue of funding. Where commercial interests are involved in contested faculty proceedings (e.g. a petition to allow the grant of a way leave to a utility undertaker) legal representation is usually engaged by the petitioners. Where the petitioners are private individuals or parochial church councils they may not have the resources to instruct solicitors and counsel; though it is not uncommon for counsel to appear pro bono.

== Registrars ==
The registrar of the diocese is also the registrar of the consistory court. The registrar must be a solicitor of the Senior Courts of England and Wales or a barrister in England and Wales. (Note: The person must also be "learned in the ecclesiastical laws and the [other] laws of the realm" and must be a communicant.) He was usually also the legal secretary to the bishop, and now must be a legal adviser, and is registrar to the archdeacons. He must be learned in ecclesiastical law, and be a communicant of the Church of England. He is appointed by the bishop after consultation with the Bishop's Council and the Standing Committee of Diocesan Synod.

There may be a deputy registrar who carries out some of the work of the registrar. There may be a separate clerk of the court, if there might be a conflict of interest for the registrar to act in this capacity.

Each consistory court has a seal, which is in the care of the registrar.

== Discipline of clergy ==
Consistory courts no longer have criminal (i.e. disciplinary) jurisdiction over the clergy.

The machinery under which the clergy formally could be disciplined in a consistory court was contained in the Ecclesiastical Jurisdiction Measure 1963. Courts were convened on only three occasions under that legislation. The last discipline case to be heard by a consistory court was that of Brandon Jackson, the Dean of Lincoln, who was acquitted of sexual misconduct in 1995. A number of disciplinary cases have subsequently been heard by the new bishops' disciplinary tribunals established by the Clergy Discipline Measure 2003.

== Appeals ==
An appeal generally lies from the consistory court of a diocese to the Court of Arches or the Chancery Court of York, depending on whether the diocese is in the Province of Canterbury or the Province of York. Permission to appeal is needed, either from the consistory court or from the appeal court. However, if the appeal to any extent relates to a matter involving doctrine, ritual or ceremonial then the appeal lies instead to the Court of Ecclesiastical Causes Reserved and permission to appeal is not needed. For determining the court to which an appeal lies, on the application of a party to the proceedings in the consistory court the chancellor must give a certificate stating whether or not the proposed appeal relates to any extent to a matter involving doctrine, ritual or ceremonial. The permission of the consistory court, the Vicar General's court, or the Dean of the Arches and Auditor is required for an appeal, depending on the nature of the case.

In faculty cases, a further appeal lies from the Court of Arches or the Chancery Court of York to the Judicial Committee of the Privy Council but only with the permission of the Judicial Committee. A decision of the Court of Ecclesiastical Causes Reserved can be appealed from by presenting a petition to the Clerk of the Crown in Chancery that His Majesty appoint a Commission of Review.
