= Lambeth degree =

Academic degree conferred by Archbishop of Canterbury

A Lambeth degree is an academic degree conferred by the Archbishop of Canterbury under the authority of the Ecclesiastical Licences Act 1533 (25 Hen. 8. c. 21) as successor of the papal legate in England. The degrees conferred most commonly are DD (Doctor of Divinity), DCL (Doctor of Civil Law), DLitt (Doctor of Letters), DMus (Doctor of Music), DM (Doctor of Medicine), BD (Bachelor of Divinity) and MA (Master of Arts). The relatively modern degree of MLitt (Master of Letters) has been conferred in recent years, and the MPhil (Master of Philosophy) and PhD (Doctor of Philosophy) are now available.

== Nature of the degrees ==
The continued authority of the archbishop to confer degrees is recognised in accordance with section 216(1) of the Education Reform Act 1988 by the Education (Recognised Bodies) (England) Order 2013. There are two types of degrees awarded: those for the recognition of service to the church and those for which an examination is required.

Lambeth degrees are legally substantive degrees, awarded only to those individuals deemed to have met the requirements for the degree in some way. They are awarded in recognition of prior learning or experience, but also serve as a form of church honours system. The extent of a person's learning is taken into account when it is being decided what degree should be conferred. An eminent and much-published scholar may be considered suitable for a doctorate, an experienced cleric or lay minister may be awarded the MA, and a senior figure with some published work may be considered for the BD. For some time in the 19th and 20th centuries, new diocesan bishops traditionally received the DD on appointment, but since 1961 this has not been the custom and all awards are made on an individual basis.

Because they are substantive degrees, holders of Lambeth doctorates are able to use the title "Doctor" (for example as "Dr John Smith") without the restrictions that sometimes apply to honorary degrees. The Latin designation of Canterbury, Cantuar, is used to explain the origin of the degree (for example "John Smith DD (Cantuar)" in the case of a Doctor of Divinity).

A Lambeth DD was awarded in 1987 to Chief Rabbi Sir Immanuel Jakobovits and others to Chief Rabbi Jonathan Sacks in 2001 and Rabbi Tony Bayfield in 2006; Lambeth degrees can be awarded to those who are neither Anglican nor members of other Christian denominations.

Degrees by examination are awarded by the archbishop at an annual service in the chapel at Lambeth Palace, in the framework of Evening Prayer – held separately from the service for the more "honorary" Lambeth degrees.

The archbishop's power to grant degrees did, and still does, require confirmation by the Crown and so the degrees are known as "degrees of the realm". All recipients have to be able to swear an oath to the monarch of the United Kingdom and Commonwealth realms, since the Ecclesiastical Licences Act 1533 speaks of the monarch conferring degrees on his subjects. Applicants must fall into one of these categories (according to the Handbook for Students and Supervisors (2014)):

1. British subjects;
2. nationals of Commonwealth countries which retain the King as head of state;
3. holders of dual nationality;
4. members of the clergy of the Church of England’s Diocese in Europe;
5. foreign nationals who have British residency or who are permanently domiciled in the UK, and who are not otherwise prevented by virtue of their own nationality and citizenship from taking the Oath of Allegiance.

Due to the ambiguous nature of the degrees awarded, especially those that do not have an examined element, the award of Lambeth degrees had often been criticised. Some Archbishops, notably Welby, had silently stopped awarding them for a time, whilst some stronger critics have called for them to be abolished outright.

== Degrees and diplomas ==
The degrees for which examination is required fall under the ambit of the Archbishop of Canterbury’s Examination in Theology (AET). There were two grades, the STh and the MA. The first was the Lambeth Diploma of Student in Theology (STh). The Lambeth Diploma was established in 1905 to provide a means of scholarly theological study and to encourage women to study theology. It was originally for women only and only since 1944 has it been for men also. It might be conducted by examination (part one in three biblical studies subjects, part two in four doctrine and optional subjects) or, since 1913, by a 30,000-40,000 words thesis for suitably qualified candidates (originally with a theology degree but, since 1969, other suitable theological qualifications).

Whether by examination or by thesis a candidate must have passed, or be exempted from, a paper in New Testament Greek. The standard was that of an honours degree. Successful candidates might join an association of Lambeth diploma holders. Most awards were by thesis alone in the latter years of the qualification.

== Master of Arts by thesis ==
A limited number of candidates with good theology qualifications might apply for a Lambeth Master of Arts degree by thesis, with the period of registration being usually between two and five years. Theses were limited to a maximum of 50,000 words, excluding the bibliography and bibliographic references, and a 1000 word abstract. The degree is styled MA Lambeth or MA Cantuar or (much more rarely) MA Canterbury. There might be no more than thirty candidates on the books at any one time.

MA examinations were introduced by Archbishop Tait in the late 19th century, but were brought to an end in the early part of the 20th century by Archbishop Davidson. The MA degree was reinstated by Archbishop Runcie at the request of the Lambeth Diploma Committee to meet a need to provide for the possibility for theological study at a more advanced level than that offered by the diploma. The first award of the new degree was in 1993.

Candidates must have had at least a second class first division honours degree in theology or a subject related to the proposed thesis topic or, alternatively, a STh with distinction or another equivalent qualification. Applications were considered twice yearly by a committee appointed by the archbishop. Applicants were then interviewed by the director or a nominated member of the committee. The thesis was written under the direction of a supervisor appointed by the committee. It was examined by at least two examiners and the degree of MA awarded if the candidate's work was approved by both examiners and endorsed by the committee.

== Expansion of the programme ==
On 11 September 2007 the then Archbishop of Canterbury announced a new higher degree programme as an expansion of the Archbishop’s Examination in Theology. Applications for PhD and MPhil degrees in theology were accepted from early 2008 with the first awards of the new MPhil degrees anticipated in 2012 and doctorates shortly afterwards. The MA was to be phased out, but the STh would continue. However, in 2009 it was decided to also phase out the STh and focus entirely on the new research degrees. The AET has now itself been replaced with the Lambeth Research Degrees in Theology 'brand'.

The first two PhDs were awarded in 2012, to the Reverend Canon Les Oglesby and the Reverend Canon Robert Reiss. Canon Oglesby's thesis was titled "God's involvement with evil: a dialogue between psychology and theology constructed from the works of Carl Gustav Jung and Hans Urs von Balthasar". Canon Reiss's thesis title was "The testing of vocation: the twentieth century history of the Central Advisory Council for the Training of the Ministry and its successors".

The Archbishop's Examination in Theology is run by a committee, and the key office holders are the Reverend Jeremy Morris (director), the Reverend Canon Les Oglesby (academic registrar) and the Reverend Cortland Fransella (Lambeth awards officer).

In March 2016 on the third anniversary of his installation, the Archbishop of Canterbury announced a new set of non-academic Lambeth Awards, to be made annually, to recognise outstanding service in various fields. The new suite of awards consist of three existing Lambeth Awards – the Lambeth Cross, the Canterbury Cross and the Cross of St Augustine – and six new awards named after previous holders of the office of Archbishop of Canterbury. Each recognises outstanding service in different fields, including those of the archbishop’s ministry priorities: prayer and the religious life; reconciliation; and evangelism and witness. In view of these awards and the establishment of the AET, the current archbishop does not plan to award Lambeth degrees in the short term, so such nominations are not currently invited.

== Academic dress ==
As with many degrees from elsewhere, holders of a Lambeth degree are entitled to wear academic dress. However, the academic dress worn is not unique, original or exclusive. The tradition is to wear the academic dress of the institution from which the archbishop graduated, which has always been either Oxford or Cambridge except for George Carey and Sarah Mullally. The reasoning was that Oxford and Cambridge were the only universities in existence at the time the powers to award degrees where given to the AoC, so they were sort of 'degrees of the realm'.

Carey, a graduate of the University of London, followed tradition and chose Oxford dress. The then Vice-Chancellor of the University of London, Graham Zellick, attempted to see if London academic dress could be used but his attempt proved fruitless. It is uncertain whether robes from a university other than Oxford or Cambridge can be used when the archbishop is not an Oxford or Cambridge graduate.

There has been talk of whether holders of Lambeth degrees should have distinctive academic dress and some Lambeth degree holders have designed their own dress to wear, for example, Dr Turpin who commissioned an Oxford and Cambridge hybrid DMus robe.

However, the Lambeth STh Diploma has a distinctive academic dress. The hood is of black stuff of full Cambridge shape with the lining divided horizontally. The lower half is of light blue silk and the upper half is of white silk, so that the lining appears white over blue when worn. This is an unusual pattern for academic hoods in the UK so some STh hoods have been made of black stuff of full Cambridge shape, lined with mid-blue silk, and the cowl faced with eight inches of white silk. The gown is of the London BA pattern but with blue cords and buttons on the sleeves.

== See also ==
- Holders of a Lambeth degree

== Bibliography ==
- Cox, Noel (2002–2003). "Dispensation, Privileges, and the Conferment of Graduate Status: With Special Reference to Lambeth Degrees". Journal of Law and Religion. 18 (1): 249–274. doi:10.2307/1051500. JSTOR 1051500.
- Thresher, Marjorie (1989). A Venture of Faith: History of the Lambeth Diploma 1905–1989. London: STh Association.
