= Richard Dale (disambiguation) =

Richard Dale (1756–1826) was an American naval officer.

Dick, Dickie or Richard Dale may also refer to:

- Richard Dale (economist) (born 1943), economist, lawyer and historian
- Dick Dale (1937–2019), American surf guitarist
- Dick Dale (singer) (1926–2014), American singer and saxophonist on The Lawrence Welk Show
- Dickie Dale (1927–1961), English Grand Prix motorcycle racer
- Dickie Dale (footballer) (1896–1970), English footballer

== See also ==
- Richard Daley (disambiguation)
