= Grey Coat Hospital =

Secondary school in London, England

The Grey Coat Hospital

Location
- Greycoat Place; London, SW1P 2DY; England; 51.4960°N 0.1343°W

Information
- Type: Academy; Comprehensive School
- Motto: God Give The Increase
- Religious affiliation: Church of England
- Established: 1698; 328 years ago
- Founders: Eight parishioners of the parish of St Margaret's: Robert Maddock, John Holmes, Thomas Wisdome, Samuel Mitchell, Richard Ffyler, Charles Webbe, John Wilkins, and Simon Boult; Elsie Day (1874)
- Specialist: Language
- Department for Education URN: 138313 Tables
- Ofsted: Reports
- Headteacher: Susanne Staab
- Gender: Girls; Coeducational (sixth form)
- Age: 11 to 18
- Enrolment: 1026 (approx)
- Houses: G, R, Y, C, T, H
- Colours: Queen Anne crimson and grey
- Nickname: GCH, Grey Coat(s)
- Publication: The Grey Coat
- Alumni: Old Greys
- Website: www.gch.org.uk

The Grey Coat Hospital is a comprehensive secondary school for girls aged 11 to 18, and boys in sixth form, run by the Church of England. It has academy status and is located in Westminster, England. In 2022, it had 1,142 pupils. It is a specialist Language College.

== History ==
The school was formally established at the Trustees' first meeting on St Andrew's Day in 1698. Eight members of the congregation of St Margaret's, Westminster donated toward its founding, initially as a day school for 50 boys. Its aim was to teach poor children reading, writing, and accounting through Christian principles, and to apprentice them to "honest trades and employments". It opened on 9 January 1698 with 11 students; the first headmaster was Thomas Ashenden, on a yearly salary of £26.

=== 18th century ===
The first annual rent for the school was £5 10s, all owned by Westminster Abbey. It became a boarding school on 6 January 1701 and first admitted girls the same year.

Other benefactors later signed up, including Lionel Herne, James Vernon, his son James, John Chamberlayne, George Smallridge, John Sharp, Lady Jane Hyde, and Robert South.

There were seven original staff: Mr Ashenden, his wife, two spinsters, two nurses, and Israel Thomas. By May 1706, the school received Queen Anne's Charter, an act of incorporation which allowed it to formally hold houses and land, as well as grant leases, though it first had to set up a board. Queen Anne's Charter was read on 26 May 1706, in the presence of a board consisting of three esquires (including two Justices of the Peace), five brewers and fifteen tradesmen, who elected as the school's first President, John Moore, Bishop of Norwich. The school's seal was also created, a figure of one person planting and another watering with the motto "God giveth the increase". The school's popular name became "The Grey Coat Hospital" after the colour of the clothes provided for the children.

In 1710, John Sharp succeeded as second President of the school and tried to follow up on an earlier petition by the Bishop of Bristol Dr Smallridge to Queen Anne for funds, but failed despite her request that the school take in two girls who had been orphaned due to the War of Spanish Succession.

The Queen invited the school's children to watch the procession on seats erected for them on Fleet Street against Somerset House at a Harvest Festival Service at St Paul's Cathedral after the signing of the Treaty of Utrecht. Orders were given for the children to have "small beer and bread and cheese before they started, and buttock of beef and strong beer on their return." Beer, wrote Headmistress Elsie Sarah Day, was the only drink provided for the children until the reign of Queen Victoria, when milk and water replaced it, except at dinner.

From 1785, 60 boys and 30 girls were admitted. The girls were taught needlework trades and were mostly placed in domestic service. The boys were employed in a variety of occupations, and a number went to sea, either apprenticed to naval officers or to trading companies. For this they were taught mathematical skills, including the art of navigation. Selected Grey Coat Hospital boys attended a mathematical school in Covent Garden for three days a week. A mathematical master was appointed to the staff in 1739. David Thompson, admitted in 1777, benefitted from this education. In 1784 he was apprenticed to the Hudson's Bay Company for seven years and became a famous explorer. During the late eighteenth century, a study of the school's archives in its first two centuries by Elsie Sarah Day reveals that the management of the school deteriorated and pupils tried to escape the dishonest and incapable masters and mistresses on a number of occasions.

=== 19th century ===
In 1873, it was agreed that it was appropriate to intend the Grey Coat Endowments to girls only, as provisions existed for the boys under other trusts. In March 1873, a newly constituted body of Governors, chaired by the civil engineer Henry Arthur Hunt undertook to carry out the scheme of the Endowment Schools Commission. One of its first duties was to arrange for the boys: some were received at Emanuel School, then in Westminster, whose girls took their place in the Grey Coat Hospital, and others went to Ashford, then the Welsh School. Elsie Sarah Day became the first headmistress of the only girls' school under church management when she joined in 1874.

The Governors had pledged to establish a girls' boarding school, so in early in 1894 they purchased Amersham Hall. It opened in May 1894 with 39 girls and is still connected with The Grey Coat Hospital though the oversight of the United Westminster & Grey Coat Foundation.

Other Presidents were Thomas Secker, Frederick Cornwallis, and Charles Manners-Sutton, who were archbishops of Canterbury. Notable Governors included Samuel Wilberforce. In law and politics they also included the Right Hon. Spencer Perceval, the Vice Chancellor Sir William Page Wood (or Lord Hatherley), and the Right Hon. John Charles Herries, Chancellor of the Exchequer.

Until 1894, The Grey Coat Hospital had been self-supporting through its endowments and termly fees. That year grants in aid were received from the London County Council for LCC scholars.

=== 20th century ===
In 1908, the school was placed on the grant list of the Board of Education and, in 1920, became an LCC assisted school, without relinquishing any of its distinctive characters.

During World War II, the school was evacuated twice, first to Brighton, then to Farnham, Surrey. While unoccupied, the old seventeenth-century building was almost destroyed during an air raid on the night of 10–11 May 1941. After the war, the school continued in temporary accommodation while it was being rebuilt. In July 1955, the school moved back into new buildings on its original seventeenth century site, with a restored original façade, and was opened by Princess Alexandra.

The provisions of the Education Act 1944 ended the Grey Coat Hospital's preparatory department after almost 250 years, and the school became entirely non-fee paying. Seven years later the school became voluntary aided.

In 1977, the Grey Coat Hospital amalgamated with St Michael's, a Church of England secondary school in Chester Square near Pimlico Police Station to become a comprehensive school. In 1998, the Grey Coat Hospital celebrated its tercentenary by opening a new building for the Upper School on Regency Street, replacing an older site on Sloane Square. The St Michael's building was inaugurated by Queen Elizabeth II. The original building is still used primarily by years 7–9 (Lower School), while years 10–11 and the sixth form are based at the St Michael's building, though most pupils visit both sites regularly.

=== 21st century ===
In 2009 construction began on a new arts block at Lower School under the Building Schools for the Future programme. The school became a Language College in 2002, and in 2008 was also granted the status of Training School. The school encourages all students to take part in a language exchange, usually in Years 9 or 10, and has partnered with schools in Münster, Germany and Pamplona, Spain, along with a long-established link with two secondary schools in Tokyo, offering an opportunity for six girls in Year 10 to spend 10 days in Japan. In its most recent inspection report in 2009, Ofsted assessed the school as "outstanding".

In early 2015 the school came to the attention of the press when it became known that Prime Minister David Cameron was enrolling his daughter. At the time, Michael Gove, who had been Secretary of State for Education from 2010 to 2014, and his wife, journalist Sarah Vine, had already had their daughter enrolled since the previous year.

On 24 November 2020, a year 12 student, Christina Adane, was chosen as one of The BBC 100 Women of 2020, a list of the most inspiring and influential women from around the world. Adane was behind the UK petition for free school meals over the summer holidays, which footballer Marcus Rashford supported.

== Governance ==
The school became an academy on 1 July 2012. The current head teacher is Susanne Staab, who succeeded Siân Maddrell in late 2019. Maddrell had succeeded Rachel Allard in April 2011.

=== The Grey Coat Foundation ===
The Grey Coat Foundation is governed by the United Westminster & Grey Coat Foundation which formally merged at the end of March 2019. The United Westminster Schools' Foundation was created by Act of Parliament in 1873 from the union of four ancient foundations: Emanuel Hospital, founded in 1594 by Lady Dacre; St Margaret's Hospital, founded in 1633 by King Charles I; Palmer's School, founded by the Reverend James Palmer in 1650; and Hill's Grammar School, founded by Emery Hill in 1708. Originally, Emanuel Hospital pupils wore brown coats and those of St Margaret's Hospital wore a green coats. The pupils of Palmer's School wore black, so the school was called the Black Coat School from 1671 onward. The parish of St Margaret Westminster had a Blue Coat School that closed in 1898; the building, however, remains on Caxton Street. The Grey Coat Hospital Foundation and United Westminster Schools Foundation now encompass two comprehensive state academies and three independent schools. Its office is based in Westminster City School, providing a secretariat for Trustees and Governors, as well as legal and financial advice to the schools and Trustees. The schools other than the Grey Coat Hospital under the foundation are Westminster City School, Emanuel School in Battersea, Sutton Valence School in Maidstone (handed over in 1910 by the Worshipful Company of Clothworkers), and Queen Anne's School in Caversham.

== School behaviour code ==
The school has a strict behaviour code, summarised for students as "The most important rule of all is to behave well at all times inside and outside the school, in a way which will bring honour to it, credit to you and that will show courtesy and consideration for other people."

The school suspended 29 students in December 2008 for joining an open Facebook group described by the Head as "a hate campaign against a member of staff". Westminster City Council supported the school's decision. Teaching unions said that one in five teachers faces cyber-bullying, and called for expulsions in serious cases. Although the Facebook group was removed, discussions remained on another website with disparaging comments about the teacher concerned. The Daily Telegraph reported that some pupils had contacted the paper to say that the school had gone too far.

== Former pupils ==
In 2007, Ray Mears visited the school to unveil a new plaque for David Thompson, an explorer who charted much of North America. David Thompson was admitted in 1777 and apprenticed to the Hudson's Bay Company for seven years in 1784, and had a river in the Rocky Mountains named after him in recognition of his contribution to the mapping of Western Canada. One of David Thompson's contemporaries and pupils of the school was John Hatchard, who founded in 1797 of the oldest bookshops in England, still operating in Piccadilly. Ho Chi Minh, the founder of the Democratic Republic of Vietnam, was a labourer at the hospital in 1913, whilst a student in London. The actress and artist's model Eleanor Thornton, who modelled for the Rolls-Royce Spirit of Ecstasy mascot, also attended the school.

Other pupils include:

- Cecilia McDowall (born 1951) – musician and composer
- Phyllis Agbo (born 1985) – British heptathlete, represented England at the 2010 Commonwealth Games
- Abby Rakic-Platt (born 1993), actress
- Ebony-Jewel Rainford-Brent (born 1983) – the first black woman to play for the England cricket team

=== Grammar school ===
- Ann Felicity Goddard (1936–2011) – judge
- Tamsin Dunwoody (born 1958) – Labour politician
- Sarah Greene (born 1958) – TV presenter; formerly co-hosted Blue Peter, Saturday Superstore and Going Live!
- Hayley Angel Holt is a writer, director and actress born in London, England.
- Ruth Langsford (born 1960) – presenter of This Morning 2006-2021; co-anchors the talk show Loose Women
- Prof Linda Newson FBA (born 1946) – Professor of Geography since 1994 at King's College London; Director since 2012 of the Institute of Latin American Studies; winner of the RGS Back Award in 1993
- Prof Jean Seaton (born 1947) – Official Historian of the BBC since 2003; Director of the Orwell Prize since 2007
- Lowri Turner (born 1964) – fashion journalist and television presenter
- Sally Vincent (1937–2013) – Guardian journalist
- Katherine Weare (born 1950) – Professor of Education
- Heather Wheeler (born 1959) – Conservative MP since 2010 for South Derbyshire; leader from 2007 to 2010 of South Derbyshire District Council

== Former teachers ==
- Fiona Booth – Chief Executive since 2013 of the Association of Independent Healthcare Organisations, and from 2007 to 2012 of the Hansard Society (taught science from 2000 to 2001)
- Margaret Laird OBE – Third Church Estates Commissioner from 1988 to 1999 (taught divinity from 1955 to 1959)

== Buildings ==
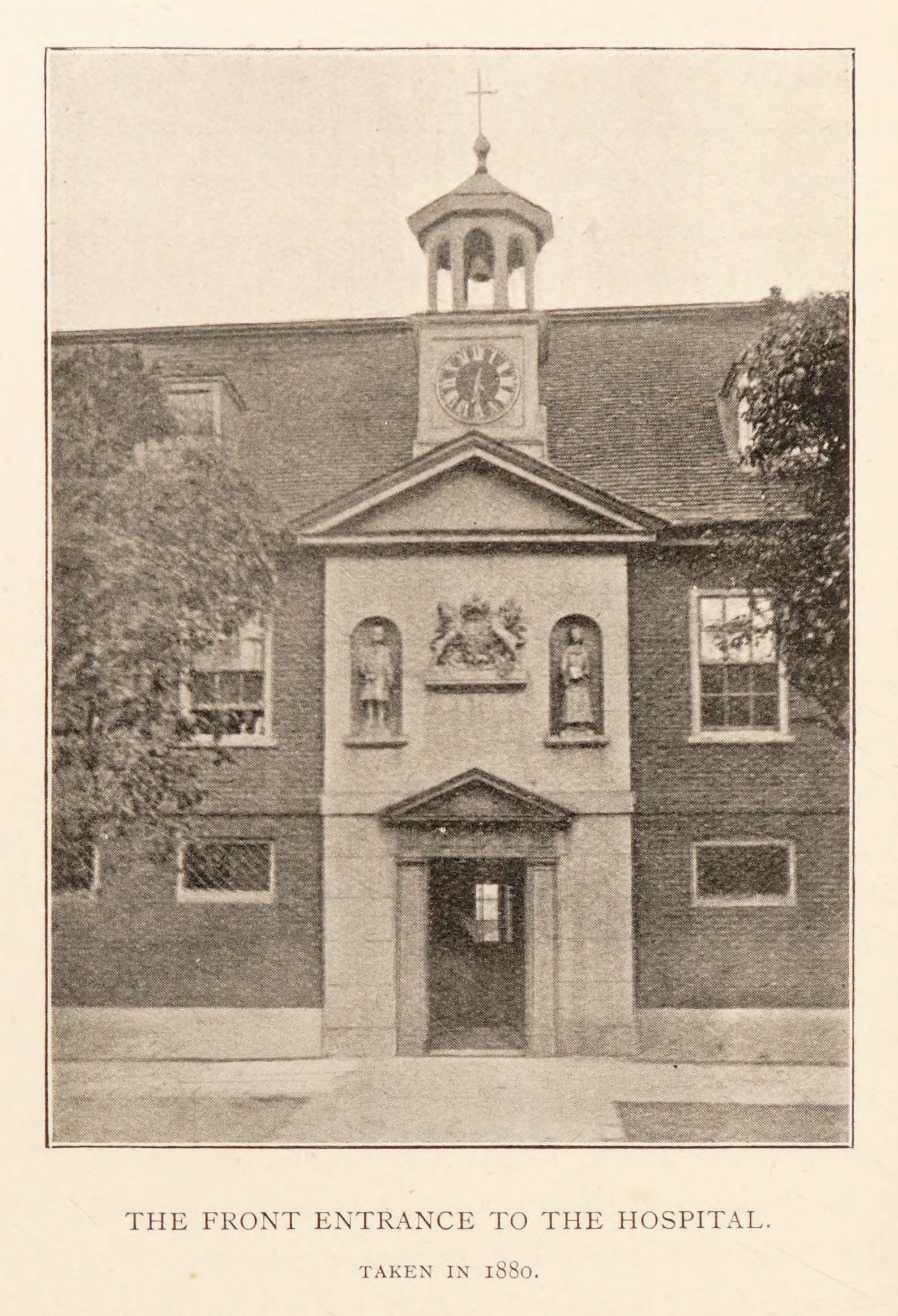
Grey Coat Hospital, front entrance, taken in 1880

The Grey Coat Hospital school is located on Greycoat Place in Westminster, central London. Its main building, centred on a three-storey brown brick block with a stuccoed centrepiece, dates from 1701. The building remained in use for more than 250 years before being damaged during the Second World War. In 1955, around a decade after the war, it was restored and enlarged with new wings designed by architect Laurence King.

The main entrance has Doric columns, a triangular pediment, and a triglyph-decorated entablature. Above the doorway are two niches containing painted wooden figures of charity school children, a girl and a boy in school uniform, which probably date from the early 18th century. Between them are the arms of Queen Anne together with her 1702 motto Semper eadem ("always the same"), moulded in Coade stone. The royal arms date from after the Acts of Union 1707.

The main building was listed in 1970 and remains protected under the Planning (Listed Buildings and Conservation Areas) Act 1990 for its special architectural or historic interest. In 1998, the school opened St Michael's, a new Upper School building on Regency Street with frontage onto Douglas Street.

== Film location ==
The 2006 film version of Stormbreaker used the building as Alex Rider's school.
