= Margaret Heather Laird =

British teacher and senior laywoman

Margaret Laird OBE
- Born: Margaret Heather Polmear; 29 January 1933; Truro, Cornwall, England
- Died: 11 May 2014 (aged 81)
- Education: Truro High School
- Alma mater: Westfield College, University of London; King's College London
- Occupation: Teacher
- Known for: Third Church Estates Commissioner, Church of England

Margaret Heather Laird, OBE (née Polmear; 29 January 1933 – 11 May 2014) was a British teacher and senior laywoman in the Church of England. From 1989 to 1999, she served as the Third Church Estates Commissioner, having been appointed by the Archbishop of Canterbury; the Church Commissioners is a body which administers the property assets of the Church of England and the Third Church Estates Commissioner attends the Church's General Synod.

== Early life and education ==
Margaret Heather Polmear was born on 29 January 1933 in Truro, Cornwall. As a child, her father attended the Anglo-Catholic Church of St Paul, Truro and her mother attended the local Methodist chapel. Having attended both church and chapel, she was confirmed in the Church of England.

She was educated at Truro High School, an all-girls private school in Truro, where she became head girl. She studied medieval history at Westfield College, London, then an all-girls college of the University of London, and graduated with a Bachelor of Arts (BA) degree in 1954. She undertook further studies at King's College London, completing a postgraduate certificate in religious knowledge in 1955.

== Career ==
=== Teaching ===
Laird's first career was in teaching. She was divinity mistress at the Grey Coat Hospital, an all-girls state school in London, from 1955 to 1959. She then taught at Newquay Grammar School, a co-education state grammar school in Newquay (1959 to 1960), and at St Albans High School, an all-girls private school in St Albans (1960 to 1962). Having married in 1961, she took a break from teaching to "concentrated on motherhood". She returned to her career, and her final teaching position was as head of religious studies at Dame Alice Harpur School, an all-girls independent school in Bedford, between 1969 and 1989.

=== Church service ===
In 1980, Laird was elected to the General Synod of the Church of England as a representative from the Diocese of St Albans. She continued to sit as a lay member from that diocese until she became an ex-officio member as a church commissioner from 1990. In September 1988, she was selected by Robert Runcie, the then Archbishop of the Church of England, to be the next Third Church Estates Commissioner. The Church Commissioners is a body which administers the property assets of the Church of England, and the Third Commissioner is chosen by the Archbishop of Canterbury. She served as Third Church Estates Commissioner for a decade, between 1989 and 1999. As Commissioner, she was a member of the Standing Committee of the General Synod and of the Church of England's Pension Board during her time in office.

In the 1999 New Year Honours, Laird was made an Officer of the Order of the British Empire (OBE) for services as a Church Commissioner.

Active in traditionalist Anglo-Catholic circles, she was a vocal opposer of the ordination of women. From 1993, she was the first female governor of Pusey House, Oxford; she was its vice-president from 2014. She also served as vice-president of the Society for the Maintenance of the Faith from 1994 until her death, and was a trustee of the Oxford Movement Anniversary Appeal Trust between 1996 and 2010. Through her husband, she also had links with Forward in Faith.

== Personal life ==
While studying at King's College, London, she met her future husband, John Laird. He was ordained as an Anglican priest in 1959, and they married in 1961. After parish ministry, her husband became chaplain and then principal of Bishops' College, Cheshunt, an Anglican theological college. After the closure of Bishops' College, he became a vicar and then one of the only domestic chaplains to a private family, as chaplain to the Marquess of Salisbury. Together, they had two sons: Stephen is an Anglican priest and chaplain, while Andrew is a classical scholar.

Laird's beliefs fell within the Prayer Book Catholic tradition of the Church of England.

Laird died on 11 May 2014, aged 81, following a terminal illness of two years. She was survived by her husband and sons.

Religious titles
Preceded by The Revd Deacon; Betsy Howarth	Third Church Estates Commissioner; 1989 to 1999	Succeeded by Gillian Joynson-Hicks
