= Gillian Joynson-Hicks =

British evangelical Anglican and activist (1942–2024)

The Right Honourable The Viscountess Brentford OBE
- Born: Gillian Evelyn Schluter; 22 November 1942
- Died: 28 October 2024 (aged 81)

Gillian Evelyn Joynson-Hicks, Viscountess Brentford, OBE (née Schluter; 22 November 1942 – 28 October 2024) was a British evangelical Anglican and activist. She served as the Third Church Estates Commissioner, one of the most senior lay people in the Church of England, from 1999 to 2005. She was also President of the Church Mission Society (CMS) between 1998 and 2007.

== Personal life ==
Gillian Evelyn Schluter was on 22 November 1942 in British Kenya. Her father, Gerald Edward Schluter, OBE, was serving in Northern Frontier District with the King's African Rifles. The family returned to the United Kingdom in 1947. She was educated at West Heath School, an all-girls private school near Sevenoaks, Kent. Having completed her O levels, she trained as an accountant by undertaking articles with a firm based in the City of London.

On 21 March 1964, she married Crispin Joynson-Hicks. He became the 4th Viscount Brentford in 1983, and as his wife, she used the style of Viscountess Brentford. Together they had four children: one son and three daughters.

Viscountess Brentford died on 28 October 2024, at the age of 81.

== Career ==
Joynson-Hicks was a chartered accountant, qualifying FCA (Fellow Chartered Accountant) in 1965. She left the profession soon after qualifying to work for her family's coffee firm, working across both London and East Africa.

=== Church service ===
Joynson-Hicks was Chair of the House of Laity of the Diocese of Chichester from 1991 to 1999, and a member of the General Synod of the Church of England from 1990 to 2005. She served as a Church Commissioner from 1991 to 1998, and then as the Third Church Estates Commissioner from 1999 to 2005. She additionally sat on the Crown Appointments Commission from 1995 to 2002, and as such was involved in the appointment of Church of England bishops.

Outside of the Church of England, she was President of the Church Mission Society (CMS) between 1998 and 2007: the CMS is an evangelical Anglican and ecumenical Protestant missionary organisation. She was a patron of the Family Education Trust, a traditionalist society with links to the New Right.

== Honours ==
In the 1996 Queen's Birthday Honours, Joynson-Hicks was appointed an Officer of the Order of the British Empire (OBE) "for humanitarian services and for services to the community in London". She served as High Sheriff of East Sussex, a ceremonial role and one of the Monarch's representatives in the county, from 1998 to 1999.

Religious titles
Preceded by Margaret Heather Laird	Third Church Estates Commissioner; 1999–2005	Succeeded by Timothy Walker
