= Eve Poole (author) =

British writer (born 1972)

Eve Poole OBE
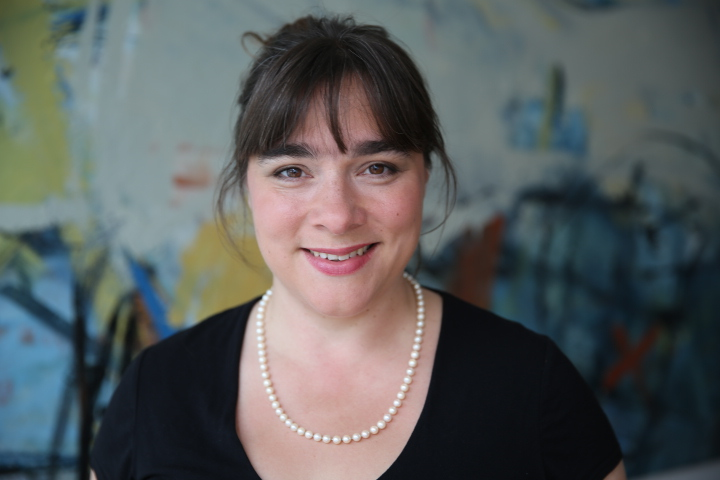
- Poole in 2014

Third Church Estates Commissioner
- In office 2018–2022
- Preceded by: Andrew Mackie
- Succeeded by: Flora Winfield

Personal details
- Born: 5 February 1972 (age 54) St Andrews, Scotland
- Spouse: Nathan Percival (m. 2007)
- Children: Two
- Education: University of Durham; University of Edinburgh; University of Cambridge
- Profession: Author
- Website: Official website

Catherine Eve Poole (born 5 February 1972) is a British writer and Executive Chair of Woodard Schools. She was Interim CEO of the Carnegie Trust for the Universities of Scotland in 2023–2024, and of the Royal Society of Edinburgh in 2022. Prior to that, she was the Third Church Estates Commissioner from April 2018 to October 2021, one of the most senior lay people in the Church of England. She was the first female Chairman of the Board of Governors at Gordonstoun, a private school in Moray, Scotland, from 2015–2021. Her books include Capitalism's Toxic Assumptions, Leadersmithing, and Robot Souls. She received an OBE for services to education and gender equality in the 2023 New Year Honours List.

== Early life and education ==
Poole was born on 5 February 1972. One of four children, she was educated at Madras College in St Andrews and at Westminster School (Connecticut), having received a scholarship from The English-Speaking Union. She studied theology at Durham University and was awarded a BA in 1993 before going on to work for the Church Commissioners. She graduated with a Master of Business Administration (MBA) degree from the University of Edinburgh in 1998. She completed a Doctor of Philosophy (PhD) degree in Divinity at Newnham College, Cambridge, in 2010 with a thesis titled From the fall of The Wall to the collapse of credit, Church of England views on capitalism 1989–2008.

== Career ==
Poole started her career working for the Church Commissioners for England between 1993 and 1997. From 1998 to 2002, she worked as a Change management consultant for Deloitte, specialising in capital markets and the public sector. In 2002, she joined the faculty at Ashridge Executive Education to teach leadership and was the Deputy Director of the Public Leadership Centre. Ashridge was acquired by Hult International Business School in 2014. Poole now is on the Hult EF Global Advisory Council and is a Visiting Fellow of their Leadership Lab. In June 2015, she became the first female Chair of the Board of Governors of Gordonstoun School.

In 2018, Poole became the Third Church Estates Commissioner, one of the most senior lay people in the Church of England, in succession to Andrew Mackie. As Commissioner, she was a member of the Church Commissioners' Board of Governors and the General Synod of the Church of England. She also chaired the Bishoprics & Cathedrals Committee and the Mission, Pastoral and Church Property Committee. During her term she successfully introduced the Cathedrals Measure 2021, which modernises cathedral governance and places Church of England cathedrals under the regulatory ambit of the Charity Commission for the first time. She was Interim CEO of the Royal Society of Edinburgh in 2022, and Interim CEO of the Carnegie Trust for the Universities of Scotland between 2023–2024.

In September 2024, Poole became Executive Chair of the Woodard Corporation; Woodard Schools is a group of Anglican schools (both primary and secondary) which have their origin in the work of Nathaniel Woodard. Poole has also been a research fellow of the William Temple Foundation and the St Paul's Institute. She was on the management boards of Theos and of Faith in Business at Ridley Hall, Cambridge. She was a founding director of the Foundation for Workplace Spirituality (2007–2014), a trustee of the Foundation for Church Leadership (2006–2012), and trustee and deputy chair of the Christian Association of Business Executives (2005–2011). She is a Life Fellow of the Royal Society of Arts and a Visiting Scholar in Human Flourishing at Sarum College. Poole was appointed Officer of the Order of the British Empire (OBE) in the 2023 New Year Honours for services to education and gender equality. In January 2024, she was installed as Canon Prebendary of Newthorpe at York Minster where she is a lay canon on Chapter. In May 2025 she was made a Fellow of the International Society for Science and Religion for her work on religion and AI.

== Selected works ==
- The Church on Capitalism: Theology and the Market (2010) ISBN 978-0230275164
- Ethical Leadership: Global Challenges and Perspectives (2011, with Carla Millar) ISBN 978-0230275461
- Capitalism's Toxic Assumptions: Redefining Next Generation Economics (2015) ISBN 978-1472916792
- Leadersmithing: Revealing the Trade Secrets of Leadership (2017) ISBN 978-1472941237
- Buying God: Consumerism and Theology (2018) ISBN 978-0334056744
- Robot Souls: Programming In Humanity (2023) ISBN 978-1032426624
