= The Alverton Hotel =

Hotel in Truro, England

- The Alverton Hotel

- Location within Cornwall
- 50.266°N 5.044°W
- Location: Truro, Cornwall, England

History
- Built for: William Tweedy of Truro Vean

Site notes
- Owner: The Cornwall Hotel Collection

Listed Building – Grade II*
- Official name: Alverton Manor Hotel
- Designated: 10 December 1984
- Reference no.: 1282635

The Alverton Hotel ("The Alverton") is located in Truro, Cornwall, England. It occupies a Grade II* listed former country house and convent on Tregolls Road, a short distance form the centre of Truro. The building originated as a private residence in the mid 19th century before becoming the principal house of the Convent of the Epiphany in 1883. In 1984, it was converted into a hotel named the Alverton Manor Hotel.

== History ==
The original mid 19th century house was built as a family home for William Mansell Tweedy of Truro Vean.

In 1883, the house was acquired by the Convent of the Epiphany, an Anglican religious community founded by George Wilkinson, Bishop of Truro. The house was converted into a convent for the Sisters of the Epiphany. A north wing was added from 1903 to 1904 to provide additional accommodation for the nuns, followed by a new chapel from 1908 to 1910. Both additions were associated with architect Edmund H. Sedding of Plymouth. The former chapel is now the hotel's Great Hall, a wedding and function space.

In 1983, due to a decline in vocations, Alverton House was sold and the twelve remaining nuns moved to Copeland Court in Kenwyn.

== Hotel ==
In 1984, the building was converted into a hotel, known as Alverton Manor Hotel. It was listed as a Grade II* building on 10 December 1984. In 2012, the hotel was acquired by The Cornwall Hotel Collection and renamed The Alverton Hotel. The group also own The Greenbank Hotel in Falmouth, The Atlantic Hotel in Newquay, and The Falmouth Hotel.
