= Jonathan Gough =

British Anglican priest (born 1962)

The Venerable Jonathan Gough SCP
- Archdeacon of Richmond and Craven
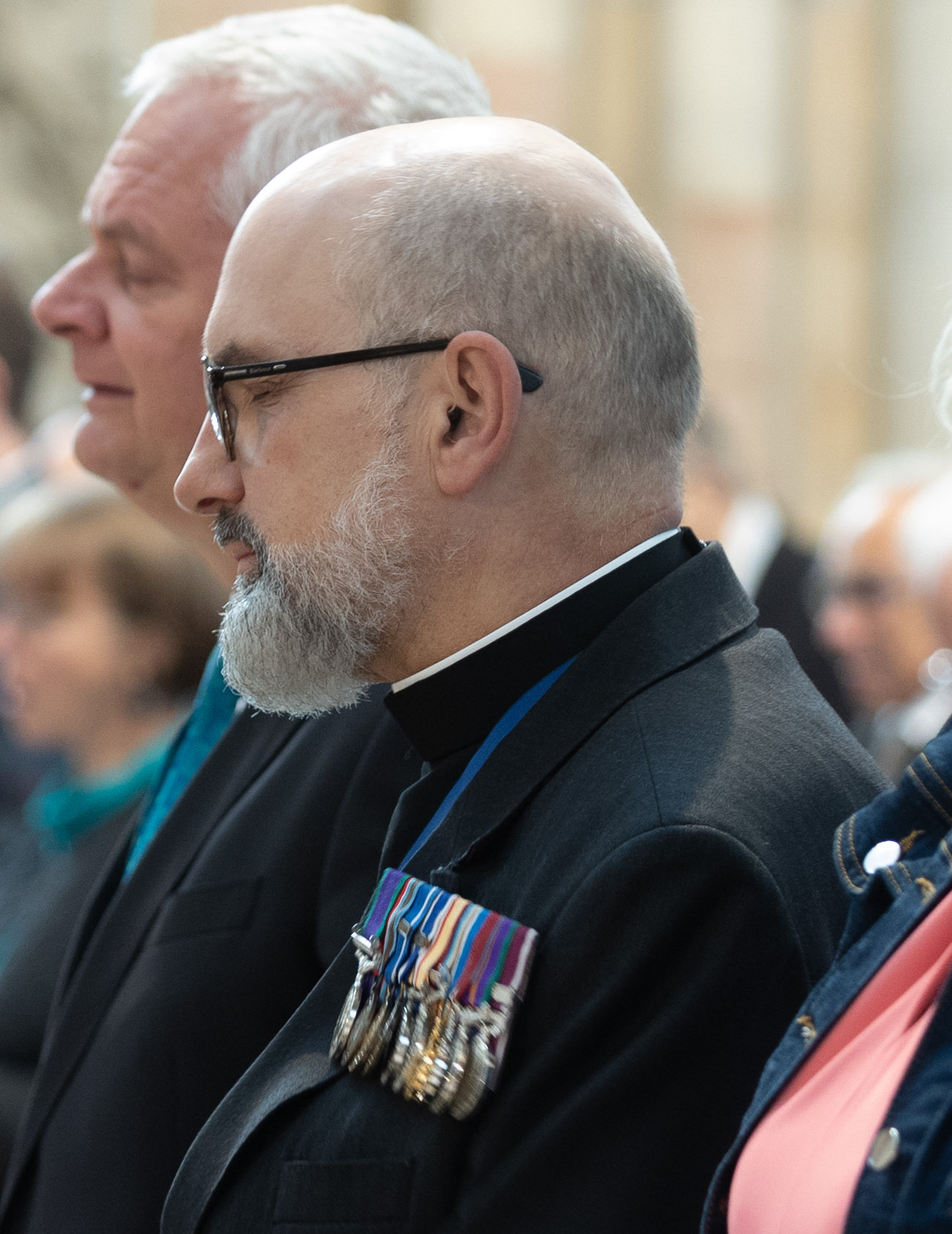
- Gough at his wife's consecration in 2024
- Church: Church of England
- Diocese: Diocese of Leeds
- In office: 2019 to 2025
- Predecessor: Bev Mason
- Successor: James Theodosius
- Other post: Archdeacon emeritus (from 2025)

Orders
- Ordination: 1985 (deacon); 1986 (priest)

Personal details
- Born: Jonathan Robin Blanning Gough; 1962 (age 63–64)
- Denomination: Anglicanism
- Spouse: Flora Winfield (m. 1985)
- Education: St David's University College; St Stephen's House, Oxford; Westminster College, Oxford
- Military career
- Allegiance: United Kingdom
- Branch: British Army
- Service years: 1989 to 2019
- Rank: Chaplain to the Forces 1st Class (colonel)
- Conflicts: The Troubles; UN Protection Force; NATO Stabilisation Force; NATO Kosovo Force; War in Afghanistan

Jonathan Robin Blanning Gough (born 1962) is a British Anglican priest and former military chaplain. He served in the Royal Army Chaplains' Department of the British Army, and then as Archdeacon of Richmond and Craven in the Diocese of Leeds from 2019 to 2025. Since 2025, he has been interim pastoral and theological advisor to the Archbishop of York.

== Personal life ==
Gough was born in 1962 and was brought up in rural Devon, England. He was educated at Exeter School, an all-boys private school. He studied at St David's University College, University of Wales, and graduated with a Bachelor of Arts (BA Hons) degree in 1983. He then matriculated into St Stephen's House, Oxford, an Anglo-Catholic theological college, to train for ordination between 1983 and 1985. He continued his academic studies and graduated from Westminster College, Oxford with a Master of Theology (MTh) degree in 1996.

== Ordained ministry ==
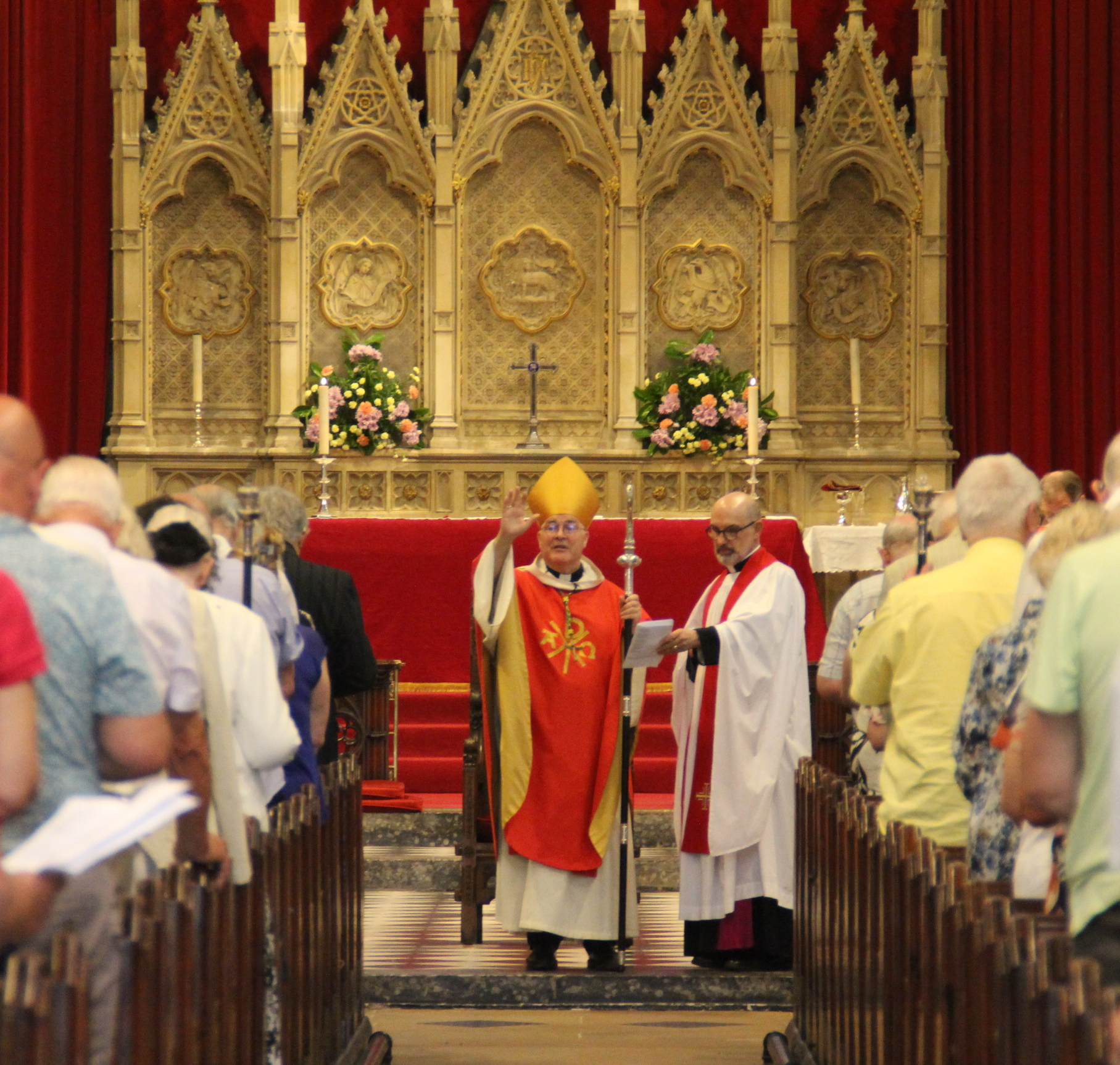
Gough (right) assisting the Archbishop of York during a service in 2025

Gough was ordained in the Church of England as a deacon in 1985 and as a priest in 1986. From 1985 to 1986, he served his curacy at St Brannock's Church, Braunton in the Diocese of Exeter. Then, from 1986 to 1989, he continued his curacy at St Katharine's Church, Matson in the Diocese of Gloucester.

He went on to serve in the Royal Army Chaplains' Department, British Army from 1989 to 2019, except for a break between 2001 and 2005. Having completed his training, he was commissioned as chaplain to the forces 4th class (equivalent in rank to captain) on 3 April 1989. He saw active service in Northern Ireland, Bosnia (UN Protection Force and NATO Stabilisation Force), Kosovo (NATO Kosovo Force), and Afghanistan. He transferred from a short service to a regular commission on 3 April 1994. He was promoted to chaplain to the forces 3rd class (equivalent to major) on 3 April 1995. He resigned his commission on 30 September 2001.

In 2001, he left the British Army to become ecumenical secretary to the Archbishop of Canterbury, based at Lambeth Palace. He was also a member of the International Anglican–Roman Catholic Commission for Unity and Mission. He was made an honorary canon of Gibraltar Cathedral in 2002.

In 2005, Gough returned to the British Army. He was chaplain to the Royal Military Academy Sandhurst from 2009 to 2011. In 2017, he was promoted to the rank of chaplain to the forces 1st class (equivalent to colonel), and appointed an assistant chaplain general. He retired from the British Army on 3 May 2019.

In December 2018, Gough was announced as the next Archdeacon of Richmond and Craven in the Diocese of Leeds, in succession to Bev Mason. He was installed as archdeacon during a service at Ripon Cathedral on 10 March 2019. He has also been warden of readers for the Diocese of Leeds since 2019. It was announced in September 2024 that Gough was to resign his archdeaconry in early 2025. Following his resignation, he was made archdeacon emeritus. On 3 June 2025, he was appointed interim pastoral and theological advisor to the Archbishop of York and is based at Bishopthorpe Palace. He is "offering pastoral, theological, liturgical, and spiritual guidance" and also "serves as a first point of contact for ecumenical and interfaith matters".

Gough is a member of the Society of Catholic Priests (SCP), a liberal Anglo-Catholic society of clergy. He is also a member of the Society of the Resurrection, a group associated with the Community of the Resurrection.

== Personal life ==
Since 1985, he has been married to Flora Winfield.
