= Archibald Frederic Hood =

Anglican priest

Archibald Frederic ("Freddy") Hood (March 1895 – 1975) was a Welsh-born Anglican priest who served as Principal of Pusey House, Oxford, Priest-in-Charge of St Mary Aldermary in the City of London, and Canon Chancellor of St Paul's Cathedral.

Freddy Hood was born in the Bridgend area in 1895, and received a BA from University College, Oxford in 1916, obtaining a first class in theology. He trained for ordination to the Church of England at Bishops' College Cheshunt, was ordained Deacon in 1920, and priested the following year.

Hood was appointed as Vice Principal of St Stephen's House, Oxford, at the early age of 25, but from 1922, was involved with Pusey House, first becoming Priest-Librarian, and leading the House as Principal from 1934 to 1952. He was an important influence in mid-20th century Oxford, and many students, including the later Poet Laureate, John Betjeman, considered him as a personal mentor.

In 1954 he became Vicar of St Mary Aldermary in the City of London. Hearing his telephone ring in the vestry during a service in 1955 provided the original inspiration for Barbara Pym's work A Glass of Blessings.

From 1961 until his retirement in 1970, Hood was Canon and Chancellor, and Chapter Treasurer of St Paul's Cathedral, London.
