= Rodney Hunter =

Rodney Hunter (1933–2006) was an English canon in the Anglican Church, serving as Chaplain at Wadham College, Oxford (1962-1965), and Priest-Librarian at Pusey House (1961-1965). He was educated at Leighton Park School and Oxford University. Much of his career was spent in Southern Africa, where he taught at St John the Evangelist Anglican Seminary in Zambia (1965-1974), and worked in Malawi from 1974 until his death in 2006.

Hunter was a staunch supporter of traditional religious and theological views within the Anglican Communion, and it has been suggested that he was murdered by poison after a dispute over the appointment of a socially liberal Bishop to the See of Lake Malawi.
