= Katherine Weare =

English academic

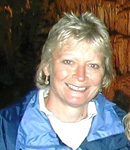
Katherine Weare

Katherine Weare (born 1950) is a Professor of Education at the University of Southampton, England.

She was educated at the Grey Coat Hospital, Westminster, the University of Kent at Canterbury, Goldsmiths College, University of London and the Institute of Education, University of London. She began her career as a teacher of English and Drama in secondary schools, and moved into higher education at the age of 25. She has researched and written extensively on mental health, emotional wellbeing, emotional and social learning.

In the 1980s she was a key player in the development of the Healthy School/Health Promoting School movement under the umbrella of the World Health Organization and the European Union. In the 1990s she worked for the World Health Organization in Eastern and Central Europe and Russia to develop work on social, emotional and health education in schools. She has helped various national and international agencies to develop their education and mental health services, including working with the European Union to develop work on preventing anxiety and depression in children and young people, and in creating an international database of effective mental health programmes for Europe.

Since the year 2000 she has advised the English government Department for Children, Schools and Families on policy in the area of social and emotional learning (SEAL). Her report to the DCSF What Works in Promoting Children's Emotional and Social Competence was a significant catalyst in the development of the English programme "Primary SEAL", a comprehensive approach to helping children develop their social and emotional skills, which can now be found in at least half the primary schools in England. She went on to be a key contributor to the writing and development of a parallel programme in secondary schools, "Secondary SEAL".

She is an honorary member of the Society of Public Health Medicine, and a board member of the international network INTERCAMHS (International alliance for child and mental health in schools).

She is editor of the journal Health Education, published by Emerald Group Publishing, and on the editorial board of several mental health journals.

== Recent works ==
- Developing the Emotionally Literate School. Sage, 2004.
- Promoting Mental, Emotional and Social Health – a whole school approach. Routledge. 2000.
