= Cheslyn Jones =

Anglican priest and liturgical scholar

Cheslyn Peter Montague Jones (4 July 1918–13 October 1987) was an Anglican priest and liturgical scholar.

== Biography ==
Jones was ordained priest in 1942 after studying at Magdalen College, Oxford. After curacies in Wallsend (1941–1943) and Northolt Park (1943–1946), he lived at Nashdom Abbey (1946–1951). He then served as Chaplain of Wells Theological College (1951–1952).

In Oxford, from 1952 to 1956, he served as Priest-Librarian at Pusey House and Chaplain at Christ Church, before moving to Chichester where he was Canon, Chancellor and Librarian of Chichester Cathedral, and Principal of Chichester Theological College. In 1971, he returned to Pusey House to take up the role of Principal. From 1981 he returned to parish work in the Diocese of Peterborough.

He delivered the 1970 Bampton Lectures on Christ and Christianity: a study in origins in the light of St Paul.

He was also a member of the 20th Century Church Light Music Group.

== Works ==
- Jones, Cheslyn (1994). Christ and Christianity: A Study in Origins in the Light of St Paul; The Bampton Lectures 1970. Chichester: Frank Hawkins. OCLC 978362210.
- Jones, Wainwright, Yarnold, C P M, Geoffrey, Edward (1986). The Study of Spirituality. Oxford: Oxford University Press. ISBN 9780195041705.
- Jones, Cheslyn, Wainwright, Geoffrey, Yarnold, Edward (1978). The Study of the Liturgy. London: SPCK. ISBN 0281035814.
