= Pusey House, Oxford =

Anglican religious institution in Oxford, UK

Pusey House
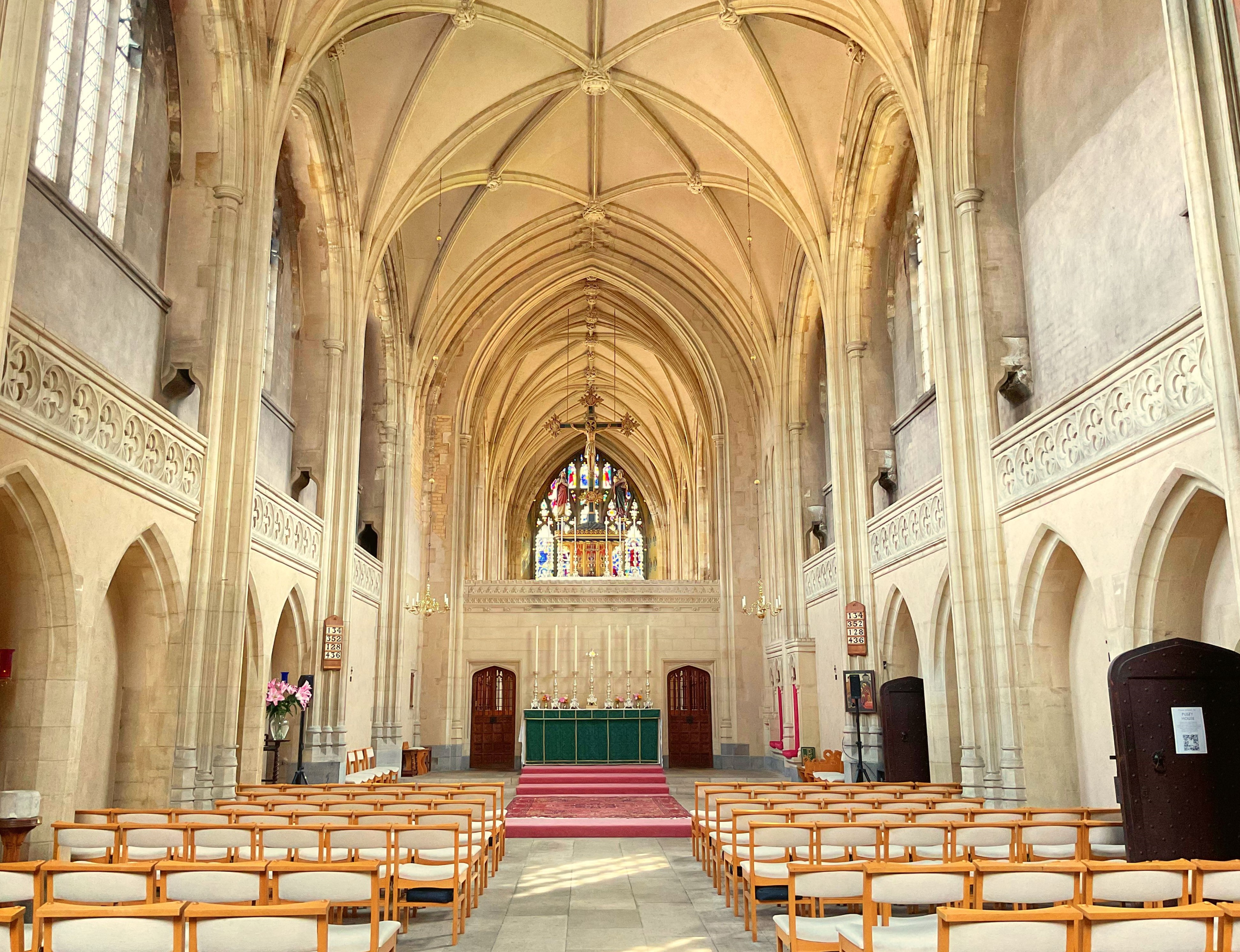
- Pusey House Chapel
- Location: St Giles', Oxford, OX1 3LZ
- Coordinates: 51.7567°N 1.2604°W
- Motto: Deus Scientiarum Dominus "The Lord is a God of Knowledge"
- Founders: Henry Parry Liddon; Charles Wood, 2nd Viscount Halifax; Frederick Lygon, 6th Earl Beauchamp
- Established: 1884; 142 years ago
- Named for: Edward Bouverie Pusey
- Architect: Temple Moore
- Principal: George Westhaver
- Chaplain: Mark Stafford

Map
- Location within Oxford city centre
- http://www.puseyhouse.org.uk/

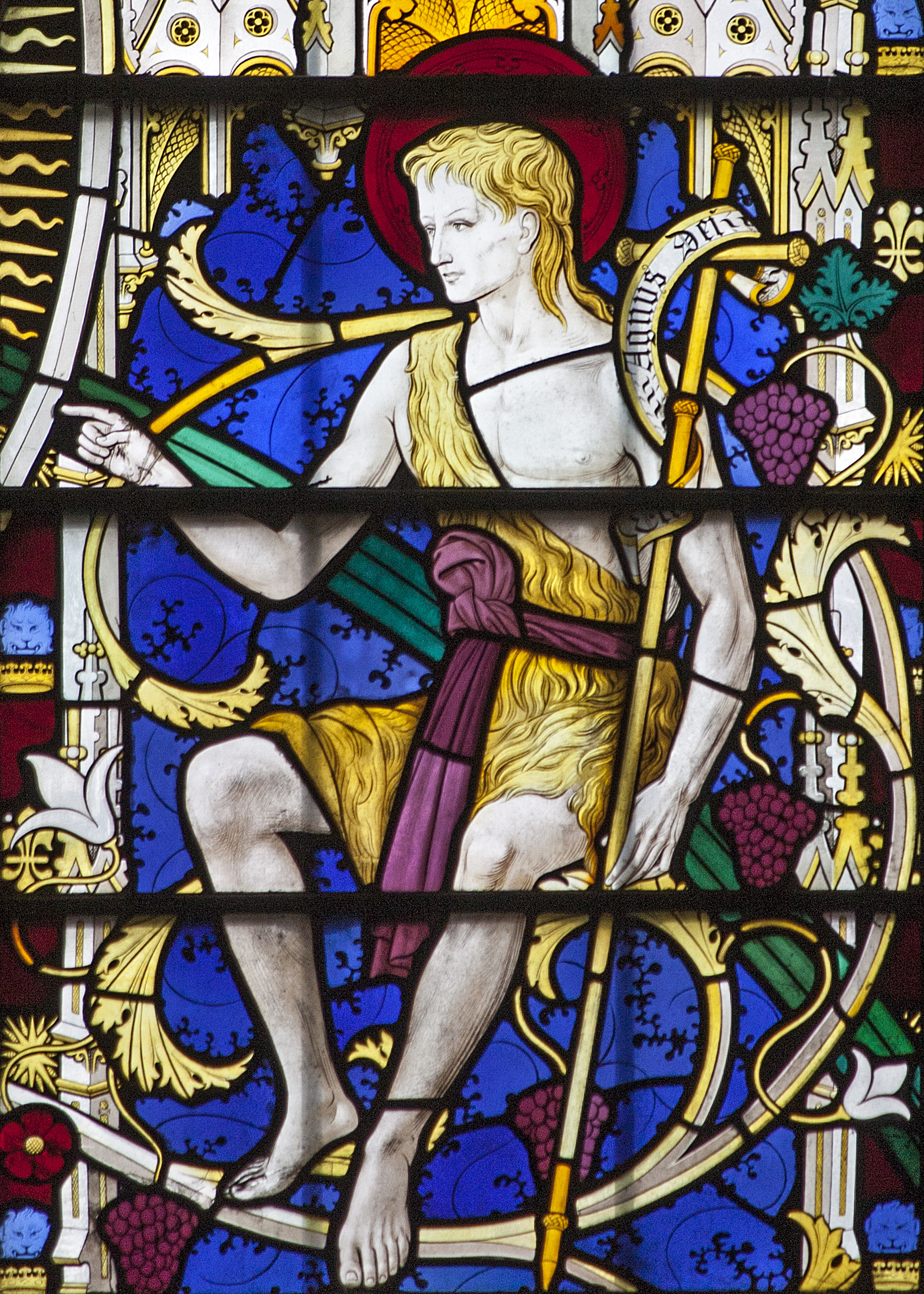
St John the Baptist shown in Ninian Comper's east window

Pusey House (/ˈpjuːzi/) is an Anglican religious institution and charitable incorporated organisation located on St Giles', Oxford, United Kingdom, immediately to the south of Pusey Street. It is firmly rooted in the Anglo-Catholic Prayer Book tradition of the Church of England and was founded in 1884 in memory of Edward Bouverie Pusey, Regius Professor of Hebrew at Oxford University and one of the leaders of the Oxford Movement.

The house was established as a "House of Piety of Learning" with a library and chapel, both of which remain open and in use today. One of the original intentions of Pusey House was to house Pusey's collection of books and since its foundation the house has come to possess many artifacts relating to Pusey and the Oxford Movement. The house's library and Archive holding one of the country's most significant collections of material pertaining to Anglo-Catholicism. The house holds daily services in its chapel, as well as regular lectures and events.

Pusey House is closely associated with Oxford University, especially St Cross College which moved onto the Pusey House site in 1981, but Pusey House is not itself a permanent private hall or constituent college.

== History ==
Pusey Memorial House was opened on 9 October 1884 as a memorial to Edward Bouverie Pusey, Regius Professor of Hebrew at Oxford University, a canon of Christ Church Cathedral and for 40 years a leading figure in the Oxford Movement, a movement of the mid-19th century which sought to bring the Church of England to a deeper understanding of its witness as part of the universal ("Catholic") church. It was also intended to continue the work of Pusey in restoring the Church of England's Catholic life and witness. It was established with a fund of £50,000 to provide a building for Pusey's library, purchase it and create an endowment so that two or more clergy could take charge of it and promote religious life in the university. The first principal was Charles Gore, who founded the Community of the Resurrection at the house in 1892. The Community moved to Mirfield (where it remains) when Gore resigned as Principal in 1897.

The house flourished in the years that followed and began to experiment with forms of quasi-monastic life. Vincent Stuckey Stratton Coles, principal from 1897 to 1909, later recorded that "for a moment it seemed as if the Pusey House was trying to become a monastery. Silence was observed at dinner on Fridays. Great regularity of attendance at the chapel offices, and regulations as to the times of retirement and rising, began to be practised." Coles had previously been the first priest-librarian, alongside F. E. Brightman, during the principalship of Charles Gore. Edward King, Bishop of Lincoln, famously quipped that "Brightman would dust the books, Gore would read them, and Coles would talk about them."

During the principalship of Darwell Stone, a new building was commissioned and eventually designed by Temple Moore, a leading Anglo-Catholic architect of his time. The house continued its work as the centre of Anglo-Catholicism in Oxford in the new buildings, attracting undergraduates such as John Betjeman and Harold Macmillan.

Since 1981, a portion of the Pusey House site has been occupied by St Cross College on a 999-year lease.

== Buildings ==
From 1884 until 1912, Pusey House occupied two townhouses on St Giles' on the site of the current building. Following a 1903 benefaction of £70,000 from a Leeds solicitor, John Cudworth, and with a growing ministry to the university, Pusey House was able to consider rebuilding. In 1910, the governors took advantage of the falling in of a lease at a neighbouring townhouse which was subsequently bought and demolished to make way for the new buildings.

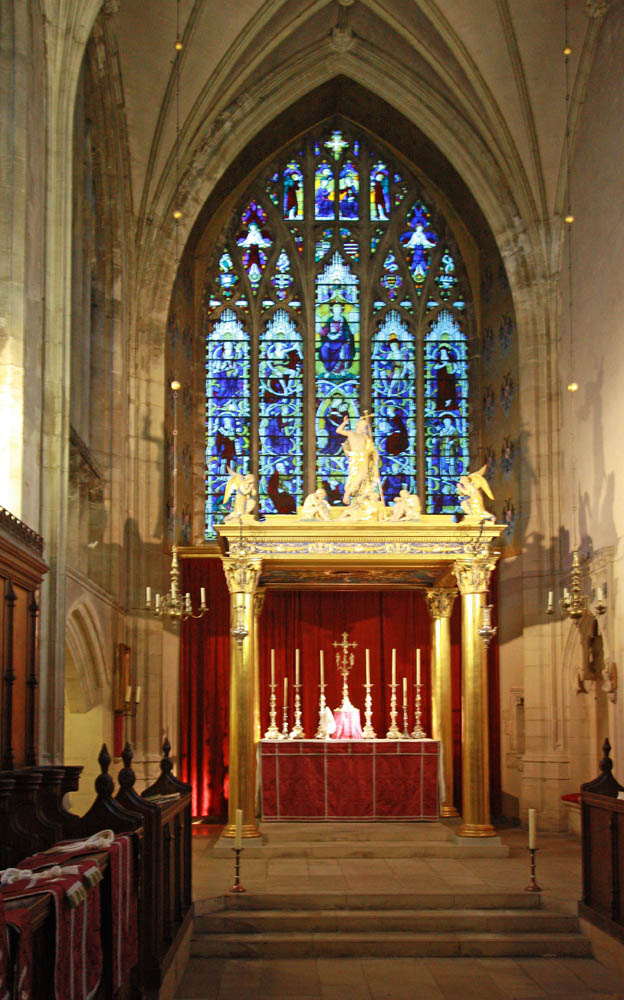
The Chapel of the Blessed Sacrament with Ninian Comper's baldacchino and stained glass

The principal at the time, Darwell Stone, requested that the new building should include a chapel "of good and simple architecture to hold about 200 and a side chapel to hold about thirty" alongside lecture rooms, domestic ranges, a library, and museum. Four architects were approached to submit designs: Harold Brakspear, Walter Tapper, Giles Gilbert Scott, and Temple Moore.

After inspecting the four proposals the building committee chose Moore's designs, formally appointing him as architect in October 1911.

Moore designed a large Gothic building around a quadrangle, its centrepiece being the two vaulted chapels separated by a stone pulpitum which he based on those found in 'medieval Franciscan priories'. The chapel and part of the library were complete by 1914, and most of the remaining portions of the building were finished in 1918. The south range of the quadrangle remained unexecuted at the time of Moore's death in 1920, and was only finished in 1925 to sympathetic designs by J. D. Coleridge.

The smaller Chapel of the Blessed Sacrament was reordered between 1935 and 1939 by Sir Ninian Comper. Comper's work in the chapel included the construction of a gilded baldacchino surmounted by the resurrected Christ and attendant angels, and the stained glass in the east window. In the east window, Comper depicted a Tree of Jesse commemorating Pusey. The window contains figures of Old Testament prophets and Church Fathers surrounding Christ in Majesty and the Virgin and Child. The figure of Pusey can be seen, kneeling at the base of the second light from the right. Comper also designed vestments for Pusey House, and specially designed his "strawberry" pattern for the chapel.

== Library ==
The library is a theological and historical collection of 75,000 volumes which includes Pusey's library and a large collection of other theological and historical volumes. Pusey's own books, bought after his death, originally formed the heart of Pusey House Library. Since then, by gift and purchase, the library has grown into a collection which has been recognised by the National Archives as a leading specialist library not only in Oxford but in the United Kingdom. In addition to its primary source material and books on the Anglo-Catholic Movement (Tractarian and Oxford movements), the library also has collections of material for the study of patristics, church history, liturgy, doctrine, monasticism and Anglican Catholic organisations.

The archive contains extensive material on the Tractarians and the Oxford Movement: the records of a number of Anglo-Catholic societies; communities of monks and nuns; letters and papers of notable Anglicans, as well as the archive of Pusey himself.

The manuscripts include papers of many notable figures, organisations and societies connected with the Oxford Movement in the 19th and 20th centuries. The most significant holdings are those of E. B. Pusey, H. P. Liddon, and S. L. Ollard, but there are also papers relating to other notable people such as William Ewart Gladstone, John Henry Newman, Frederic Hood, F. L. Cross, and John Keble.

== Worship ==
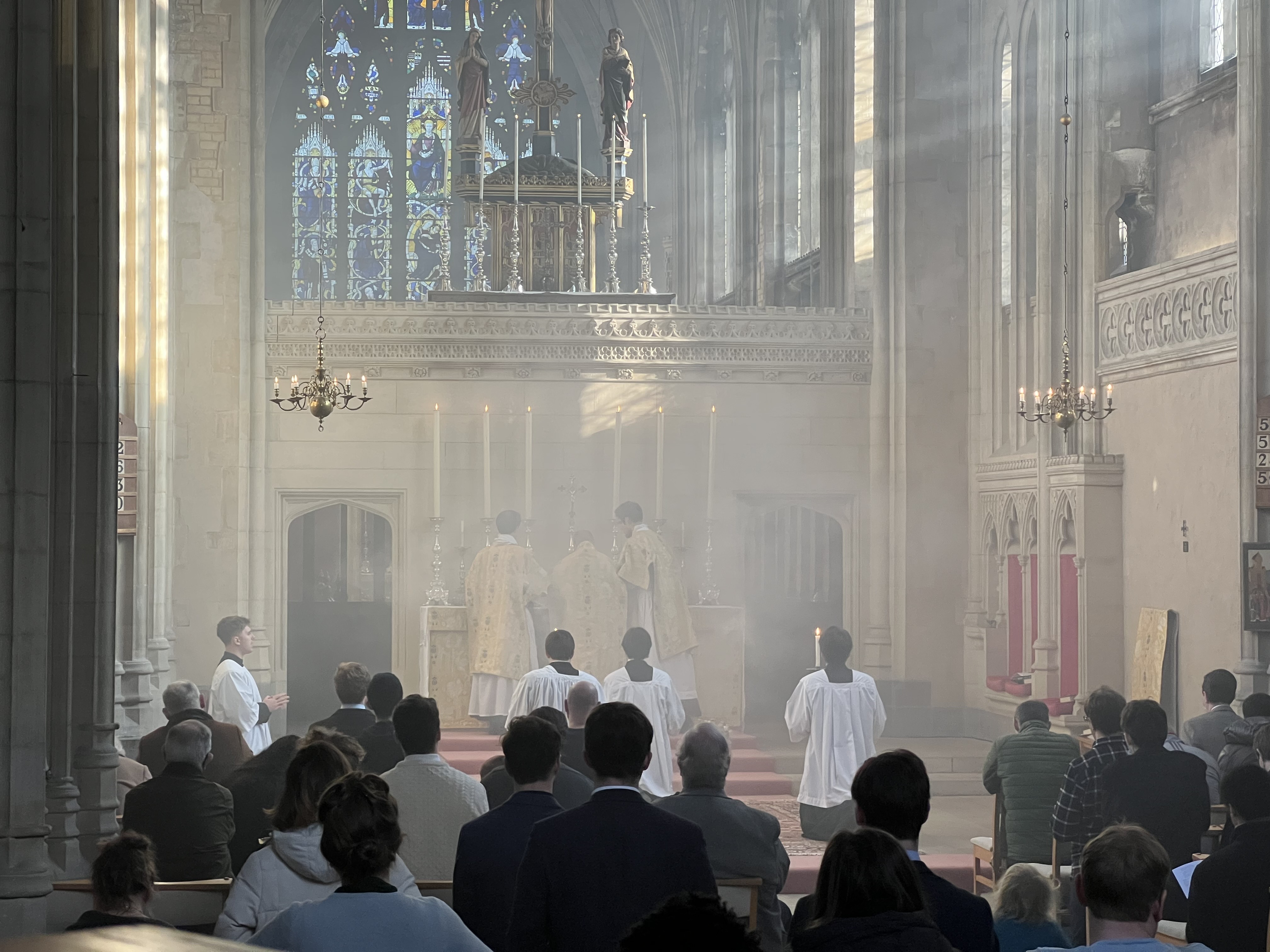
High Mass in the chapel

Worship in the Chapel of the Resurrection is in accordance with the Anglo-Catholic tradition in the Church of England and is open to all, especially to members of the university. Alongside its reputation for dignified and traditional liturgy, Pusey House is also recognised for its musical tradition, most visible at the Solemn Mass on Sundays and solemnities.

=== Services and observances ===
- Compline each Tuesday evening during full term
- Low Mass daily during full term, with a BCP celebration on Fridays
- Morning Prayer and Evening Prayer, daily during full term
- Solemn High Mass every Sunday and on major festivals during full term with the Ordinary of the Mass sung by the choir

== Music ==
The Choir of Pusey House is formed of eight choral scholars, largely students who are or recently have been members of college chapel choirs from across the University. The choir is responsible for singing at term-time Sundays (0-9th week), some weekday feasts, and other out of term services such as occasional evensongs, carol services and services through Holy Week.

Most Sundays, the choir will sing a polyphonic mass setting (which in Lent and Advent is normally replaced with plainsong) and an anthem, plainsong propers as well as support the hymns and congregationally sung Gloria and Creed. The choir's repertoire is made up of predominantly chant, Renaissance polyphony, such as that by Byrd, Tallis and Lassus, as well as later Romantic and Modern composers of English church music, Stanford, Bairstow, and Peter Tranchell. Occasionally, the choir performs works by continental 19th and 20th century composers such as Vierne and Duruflé. Pusey House commissioned a new mass setting for its 125th anniversary celebrations from the composer Alexander Campkin. Another House commission is a setting of the Hæc Dies for Easter Day by Sydney Watson.

In the past, the choir has recorded several CDs. Service music in the vacation is provided by a cantor or by musicians from the congregation often with support from members of the regular choir.

One musical highlight of the year is the choral Communion on the feast of Charles, King and Martyr according to the 1662 Book of Common Prayer. This service normally features Tudor and Jacobean and Early English Baroque music works, and choral responses to the Commandments.

The choir takes part in the "Pusey Goes to London" trips that take place every few years, often in All Saints, Margaret Street. This normally involves both current and former choir members.

The House owns an Edwardian organ originally built by J.W. Walker for St. Paul's, Slough in 1908. It was moved to the House in 2014 by Peter Collins. The House previously had an instrument by Rest Cartwright & Son of two manuals and pedals that has since been removed.

The current Master of Music is Ed Gaut.

Pusey House regularly hosts concerts and rehearsals for several Oxford-based and student ensembles and choirs.

== Principals ==
- 1884–1893: Charles Gore
- 1893–1897: Robert Lawrence Ottley
- 1897–1909: Vincent Stuckey Stratton Coles
- 1909–1934: Darwell Stone
- 1934–1951: Archibald Frederic Hood
- 1951–1970: Francis Hugh Maycock
- 1970: Barry Marshall (died before installation)
- 1970–1981: Cheslyn Peter Montague Jones
- 1982–2002: Philip Ursell
- 2003–2013: Jonathan Baker
- 2013–present: George Westhaver

== Priest Librarians ==
The office of priest librarian dates from the foundation of the house in 1884; the following is a complete list of those who have served in the role, taken from a 140th Anniversary publication, printed by Pusey House:

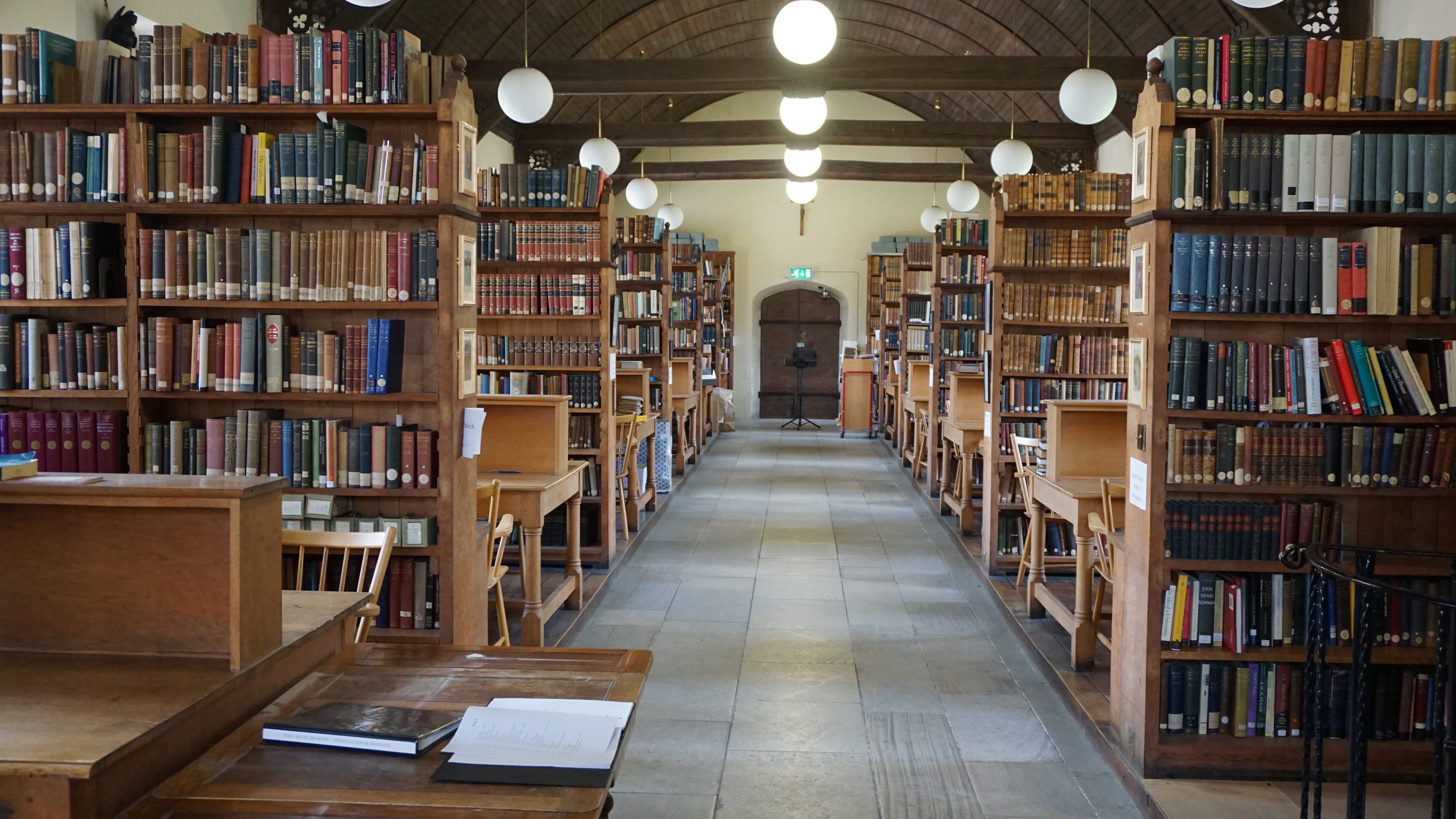
Upper Library, Pusey House

- 1884–1897 Vincent Stuckey Stratton Coles
- 1895–1903 F. E. Brightman*
- 1895-1908 Ernest Brownlow Layward
- 1895–1908 Henry Falconer Barclay Mackay
- 1897-1921 John Carter
- 1903–1909 Darwell Stone*
- 1908-1919 George Lewis Albert Way
- 1908-1917 Walter Julius Carey
- 1910-1922 George Harold Fendick
- 1919-1921 Leonard Whitcombe
- 1920-1922 Ralph Shakespeare Eves
- 1921–1924 Mark Carpenter-Garnier
- 1922-1934 Frederic Hood
- 1922–1923 Maurice Child
- 1922-1933 Miles Pearl Sargant
- 1927–1944 F. L. Cross*
- 1929–1937 Humphry Beevor
- 1935-1952 Thomas Maynard Parker*
- 1937-1941 Harold Kent White
- 1941–1946 Eric Kemp*
- 1944-1945 Henry St John Tomlinson Evans
- 1946-1952 Francis John Michael Dean
- 1946-1952 Rees William Hippsley Phillips
- 1952–1956 Cheslyn Jones*
- 1952-1955 Philip Curtis
- 1954-1960 John Macdonald
- 1957–1961 Robert Mason Catling*
- 1956-1959 Gilbert Denham Bayley-Jones
- 1960–1969 Donald Allchin
- 1961–1965 Rodney Hunter
- 1965-1968 David Meeson Morris
- 1967-1972 James Dugard Makepeace
- 1968–1971 & 1976-1978 Peter Cobb
- 1971-1976 Kenneth William Noakes
- 1978-1980 David Charles Gay
- 1980-1982 Wayne Hankey
- 1980-1982 Robert Brian MacCarthy
- 1980-1985 William John Muir Oddie
- 1983–1994 Harry Reynold Smythe
- 1987-1989 David Vernon Williams
- 1987-1989 Donald Stuart Dunnan
- 1987-1991 John Stuart Bauerschmidt
- 1991-1994 Michael Richard Knight
- 1993-1998 Kenneth Edward McNab
- 1994–2011 William Ernest Peter Davage
- 1998-1998 Lawrence Nelson Crub
- 1999-2001 Peter John Groves
- 2001–2014 Barry Orford

Those marked with an asterisk acted as library custodian.

== Notable people ==
- Donald Allchin
- Jonathan Baker
- Humphrey Beevor
- John Betjeman
- Frank Edward Brightman
- Walter Carey
- Mark Carpenter-Garnier
- Maurice Child
- F. L. Cross
- Percy Dearmer
- Tom Driberg
- Austin Farrer
- Charles Gore
- Archibald Frederic Hood
- Rodney Hunter
- John Toshimichi Imai
- Cheslyn Jones
- Eric Kemp
- Margaret Heather Laird
- C. S. Lewis
- Henry Parry Liddon
- Frederick Lygon, 6th Earl Beauchamp
- Charles Abdy Marcon
- Robert MacCarthy
- Harold Macmillan
- Robert Lawrence Ottley
- Dorothy L. Sayers
- Darwell Stone
- J. R. R. Tolkien
- Cuthbert Turner
- Philip Waggett
- Evelyn Waugh
- David Williams
- Charles Wood, 2nd Viscount Halifax

== Gallery ==
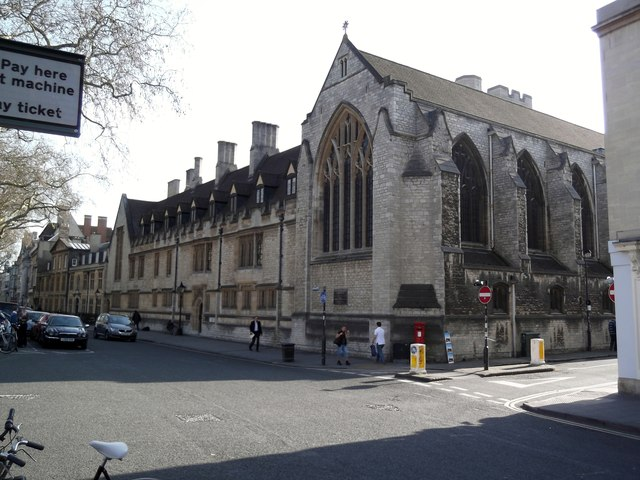
Pusey House from St Giles'

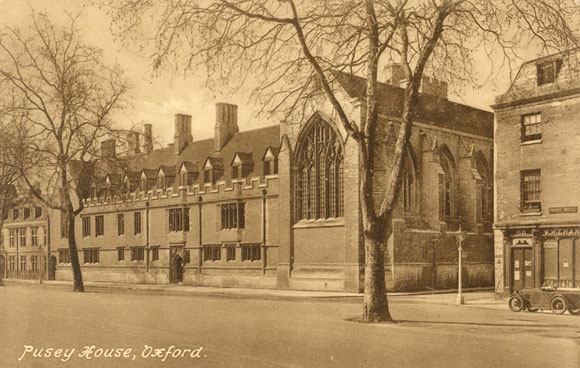
Pusey House in the 1920s

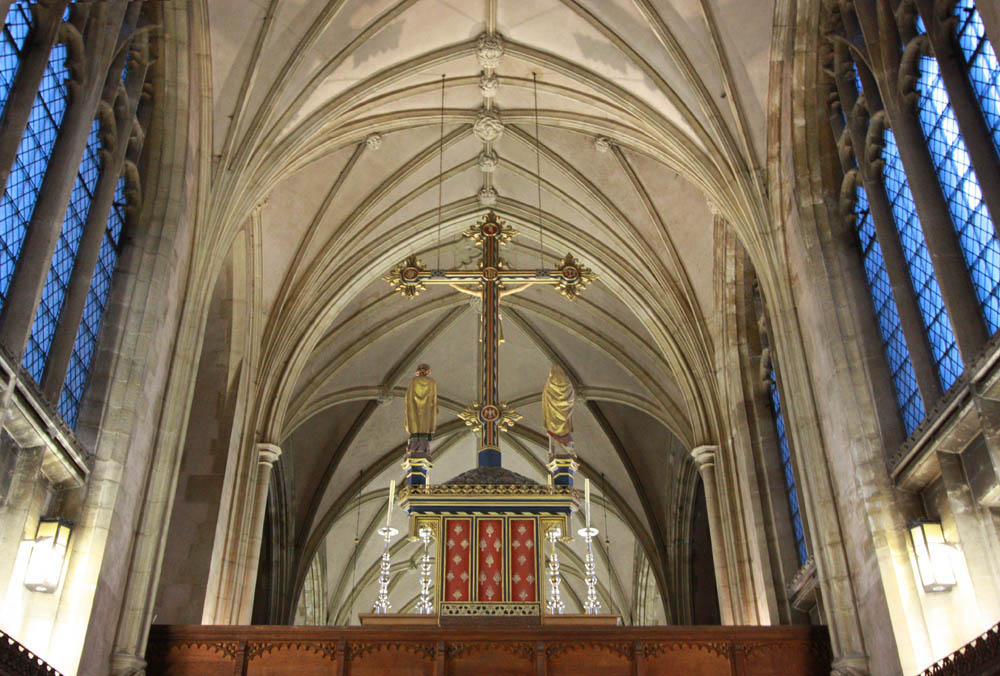
A view of the rood from the Chapel of the Blessed Sacrament

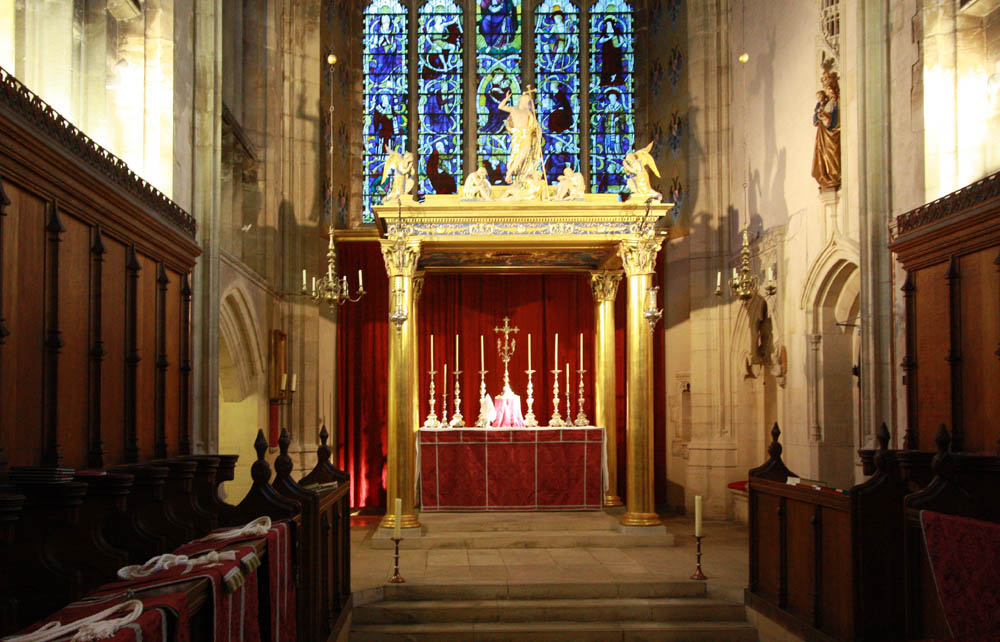
The Chapel of the Blessed Sacrament

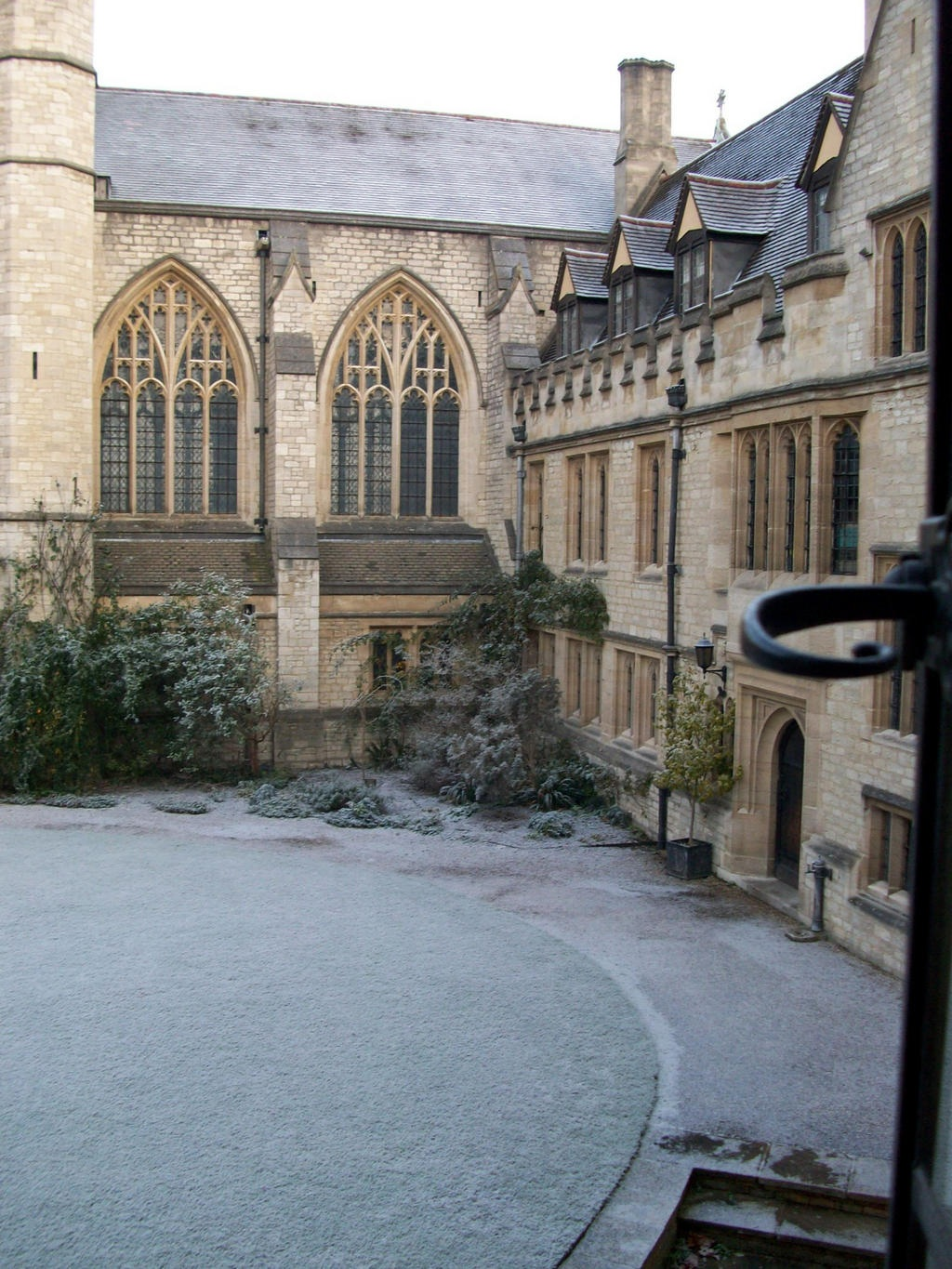
The east range and Chapel from the Quad

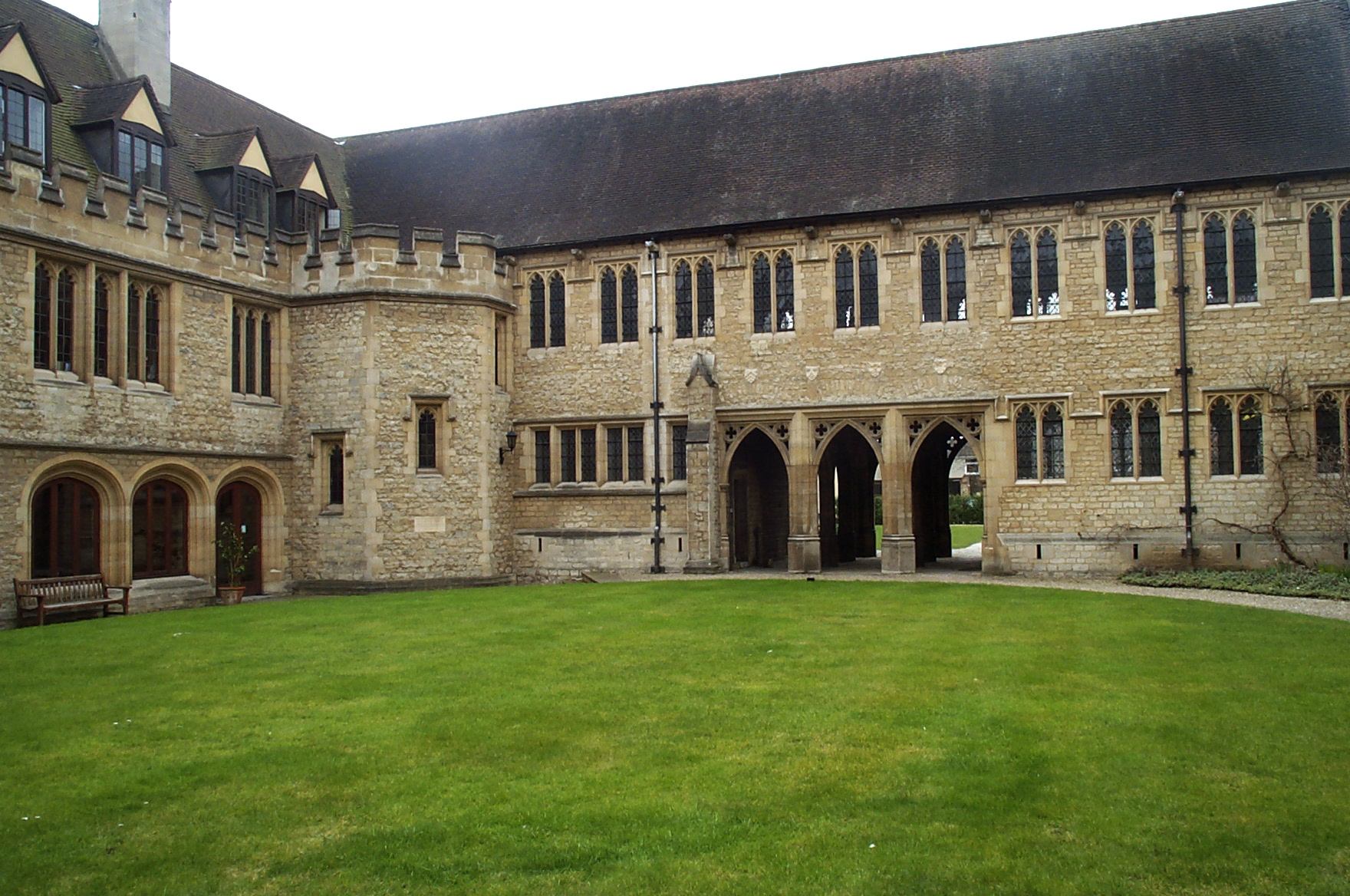
The Quad

== See also ==
- List of miscellaneous works by Temple Moore
