= Vincent Coles =

Anglican priest

Vincent Stuckey Stratton Coles (27 March 1845 – 9 June 1929) was an Anglo-Catholic priest in the Church of England, who served as Principal of Pusey House, Oxford from 1897 to 1909.

== Life ==
He was born at Shepton Beauchamp, Somerset where his father was rector. His maternal grandfather was Vincent Stuckey, a Somerset banker. Coles was educated at Eton College before studying at the University of Oxford as a member of Balliol College, Oxford, where he obtained a third-class degree. He proceeded to Cuddesdon Theological College, was ordained as a priest in the Church of England, and was assistant curate at Wantage (at that time in the county of Berkshire) from 1869 until his appointment as rector of Shepton Beauchamp in 1872.

When Pusey House, Oxford was founded in 1884, he left Somerset to become one of its three librarians, later serving as chaplain (1885 onwards) then Principal (1897 to 1909). He also served as curate at Shepton Beauchamp from 1886 to 1897. From 1910 to 1920, he was Warden of the Sisterhood of the Epiphany in Truro, Cornwall. He was an honorary canon of Christ Church from 1913. His publications consisted of some sermons, meditations and lectures. He died on 9 June 1929. He was the author of three hymns "O Shepherd of the sheep", "Ye who own the faith of Jesus", and "We pray thee, heavenly Father" (nos. 190, 218 & 334 in The English Hymnal).

His obituary in The Times said that he had a "kindly humorous understanding of young men" and "exercised a wide influence in the University", with many people across the world, both clergy and laity, owing much to his guidance.

== Bibliography ==
- Lenten Meditations
- Advent Meditations on Isaiah
- The Preparation of Graduates for Holy Orders
- Pastoral Work in Country Districts (1906)
