= St Paul's Church, Truro =

Church in Cornwall, England

Coordinates: 50°15′55″N 5°02′40.2″W

St Paul’s Church, Truro
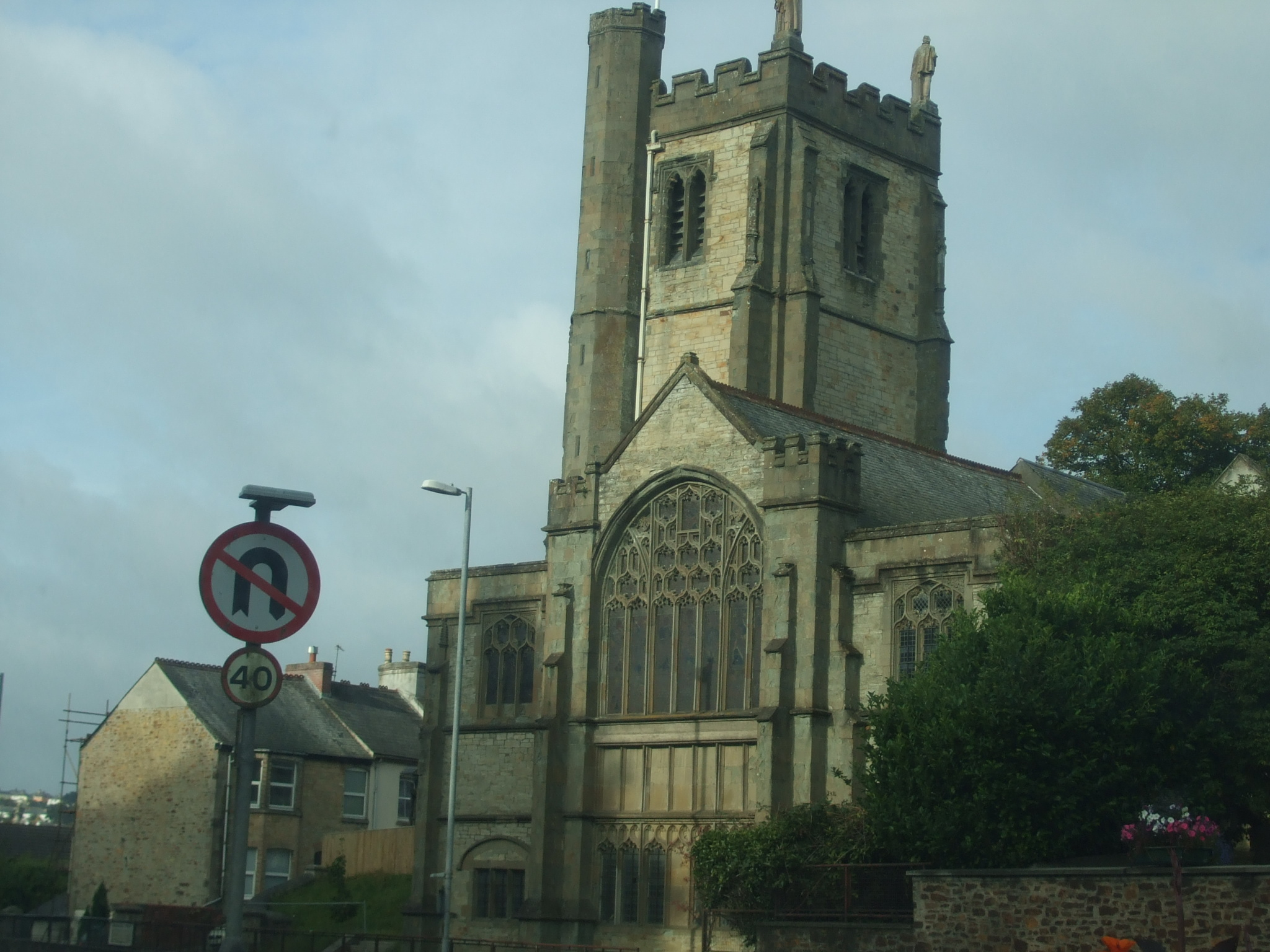
- St Paul’s Church, Truro
- St Paul’s Church, Truro
- Location: Truro
- Country: England
- Denomination: Church of England
- Churchmanship: Anglo-Catholic

History
- Dedication: St Paul
- Consecrated: 26 November 1864

Architecture
- Heritage designation: Grade II listed
- Completed: 23 November 1845
- Closed: 2007

Administration
- Province: Province of Canterbury
- Diocese: Diocese of Truro
- Parish: St Paul Truro

St Paul's Church, Truro is a Grade II listed former parish church in the Church of England Diocese of Truro and in Truro, Cornwall, that is scheduled for demolition.

== History ==
The church was built in 1845 at a cost of £2,840 (equivalent to £298,561 in 2025). The church was paid for by William Tweedy who advanced the money interest free. It opened for worship on 23 November 1845. As the church was in debt, the bishop refused to consecrate it and it took 20 years for the congregation to clear the debt and endow the living. Finally the parish raised £1,100, to which the church commissioners added £1,000, which was invested to provide a stipend for the vicar of £66 15s 4d per annum (equivalent to £7,333 in 2025).

The church was consecrated in on 26 November 1864 by the Bishop of Exeter, Henry Phillpotts, and given its own parish. By 1880 the church was insufficient in size for its growing congregation, and a committee was formed to enlarge it with the addition of a chancel, north and south aisles. The congregation employed the architect John Dando Sedding. A consecration service took place for the new chancel on 7 January 1884, which had been built by Mr. W Bone of Liskeard for £3,000 (equivalent to £322,313 in 2025).

The north aisle was added in 1889 and the church reopened on 27 June 1889.

The tower was completed by Edmund Harold Sedding in 1910.

The church is noted for its stained glass scheme by Lavers, Barraud and Westlake.

== Closure and planned demolition ==
The church closed in 2007 after significant structural problems were identified in the quinquennial survey. With an estimated repair bill of £1,000,000, the congregation decided to move to alternative premises.

In 2018, the Church of England announced that the church was too expensive to repair. Following a public hearing in September 2025, Church Commissioners announced that the building is to be demolished.

== Organ ==
The church contained an organ by Hele and Co. A specification of the organ can be found on the National Pipe Organ Register.

== See also ==
- Convent of the Epiphany
