= Sally Vincent =

British journalist

Sally Vincent (22 April 1937 – 26 December 2013) was a British journalist, best known for her interviews of prominent people.

== Background and early life ==
Vincent was born in Chelsea, London. Her father, Albert Webb, was a Metropolitan Police detective inspector, who had assisted in gathering evidence that resulted in the conviction of John George Haigh, the Acid Bath murderer. Vincent attended the Grey Coat Hospital school for girls, where she represented London in athletics and was also a skilful singer.

She was briefly married to advertising copywriter Michael Vincent, in the 1960s, and also had a relationship with the psychiatrist R. D. Laing.

== Career ==
Before becoming a journalist, Vincent was employed by a rolling paper company. From 1965, Vincent she wrote frequently for the new Nova magazine, later moving to the Daily Mirror, where she wrote a beauty column, then a column on cookery that was subsequently taken over by Delia Smith. Vincent also wrote for Punch and for The Sunday Times. In 1975 she appeared as a reporter and presenter in the four television broadcasts made by the National Referendum Campaign, advocating a No vote in the referendum on EC membership.

In 1992, she was approached by Deborah Orr (then editor of the weekend edition of The Guardian) and was offered "the pick of interview subjects, and total freedom to write pieces as long as she wanted, from whatever angle she saw fit, and with no changes to her copy without permission"' by Orr.

Orr has attributed Vincent's success as an interviewer to a mix of factors: "She was intimidated by no one. Partly, it was just hard work. Sally would always turn up ultra-fully prepared, her research exhaustive, her analysis of the available clues forensic...above all though, Sally was simply 'a natural as a writer, her minute observation and ability to ask the right question easily matched by her way with a phrase."
