= The Falmouth Hotel =

Hotel in Cornwall, England

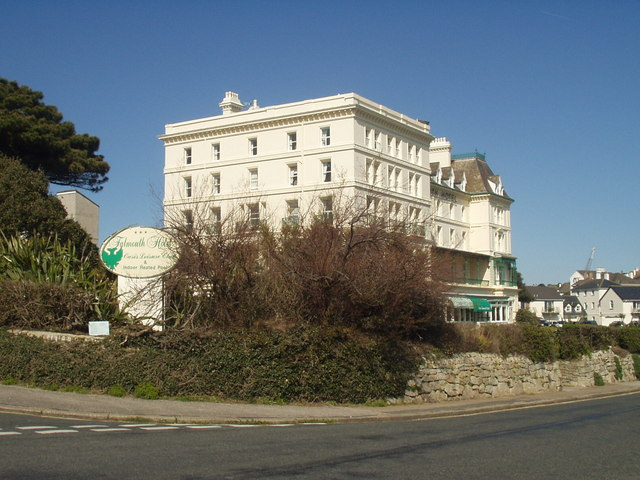
- The Falmouth Hotel

- Location in southern Cornwall
- Hotel chain: The Cornwall Hotel Collection

General information
- Location: Castle Beach, Falmouth, Cornwall, TR11 4NZ
- Coordinates: 50°8′52″N 5°3′30″W
- Opening: 9 May 1865

Technical details
- Floor count: 5

Other information
- Number of rooms: 71

Website
- https://falmouthhotel.co.uk/

The Falmouth Hotel is a Victorian hotel located on the seafront in Falmouth, Cornwall, overlooking Castle Beach. As the first purpose-built hotel in Falmouth, it opened on 9 May 1865 to provide to tourists due to the new railway station being linked nearby. It is located next to the Royal Duchy Hotel. The foundation stone was laid on 6 August 1863, by Robert Tweedy and it cost about £9000. Additions were added in 1880, 1898 and 1972. The hotel has 71 rooms and is set in 5 acres (2.0 ha) of landscaped gardens.

In May 2024, the hotel was acquired by The Cornwall Hotel Collection, returning the landmark to local ownership alongside sister properties The Greenbank Hotel, The Alverton Hotel, and The Atlantic Hotel. Previously, the hotel had been owned by the Richardson Group since 2005.

== Beatrix Potter's stay ==
During the spring of 1892, a 25-year-old Beatrix Potter stayed at the hotel for twelve days with her parents. During this visit, she wrote her earliest known picture letter to Noel Moore, the son of her former governess, dated 11 March 1892. In the letter, she described the hotel as the "big house close to the sea" and included detailed illustrations of the "puff-puff" steam train she travelled in, Falmouth harbour with its ships and fishermen, and the tame seagulls she observed from the hotel. This style of illustrated storytelling is considered a precursor to her later literary success, as similar "picture letters" eventually led to the publication of The Tale of Peter Rabbit.
