= Anna Walker (civil servant) =

The Honourable Anna Elizabeth Blackstock Walker CB (born 1951) is a British senior civil servant and regulator of services. Walker is married to Timothy Walker, with whom she has three adult children. She is the daughter of Lord Butterworth.

== Career ==
Walker succeeded Chris Bolt as chair of the Office of Rail Regulation on 5 July 2009 when Bolt's five-year term of office expired. In this role, Walker was the IRG-Rail Chair for 2013; the members of IRG-Rail consist of the independent Regulatory Bodies of twenty-one countries inside and outside the European Union. She stepped down from this role in 2015 and was replaced by Stephen Glaister.

She was Chief Executive of the Healthcare Commission from its formation on 1 April 2004 until 31 March 2009, when the commission was abolished and its functions in England were broadly subsumed by the Care Quality Commission.

- 2009–2016 Chair, Young Epilepsy
- 2009–2015 Chair, Office of Rail Regulation
- 2008–2012 Board member and vice chair, Consumer Focus
- 2004–2009 Chief Executive, Healthcare Commission
- 2001–2003 Director-General for Rural Affairs, Department for Environment, Food and Rural Affairs
- 1998–2001 Director-General for Energy, Department of Trade and Industry
- 1994–1997 Deputy Director-General, Oftel
- 1975–1994 Civil Servant, mostly at Department of Trade and Industry
- 1972–1973 British Council

== Education ==
- Lady Margaret Hall, Oxford (MA History)
- Bryn Mawr College, US
- Benenden School, Kent (where she was a contemporary of Princess Anne, now the Princess Royal)
- Oxford High School
