= Darwell Stone =

Darwell Stone (1859–1941) was an Anglo-Catholic theologian and Church of England priest.

== Biography ==
Stone was born at Rossett, Denbighshire, on 15 September 1859. Stone was educated at Merton College, Oxford. He was made a deacon in 1883 and after being ordained priest became vice-principal of Dorchester Missionary College, Oxfordshire, in 1885. He became principal of the college in 1888. From 1909 to 1934 he was principal of Pusey House, Oxford. During his adult life he strenuously maintained High Church principles and was a defender of the theology of R. W. Church and H. P. Liddon against the teaching of the Lux Mundi school. In later life he became more and more the leader of the Anglo-Catholic Movement in the Church of England and was a strong opponent of the project to revise the Book of Common Prayer. His writings were characterized by wide and accurate learning and fairness to his opponents. From 1915 until his death he was editor of the projected Lexicon of Patristic Greek.

== Selected writings ==
- 1899: Holy Baptism
- 1900: Outlines of Christian Dogma
- 1902: The Church: its ministry and authority (1st Ed.)
- 1904: The Church: its ministry and authority (2nd Ed.)
- 1905: The Christian Church (1st Ed.)
- 1908: The Church: its ministry and authority (3rd Ed.)
- 1909: A History of the Doctrine of the Holy Eucharist (2 vol.)
- 1909: The Invocation of Saints (1st Ed.)
- 1910: The Christian Church (2nd Ed.)
- 1911: Communion with God : the preparation before Christ and the realization in him
- 1912: The Invocation of Saints (Enlarged)
- 1915: The Christian Church (3rd Ed.)
- 1916: The Invocation of Saints (3rd Ed.)
- 1917: The Reserved Sacrament
