= Christina Adane =

British social campaigner

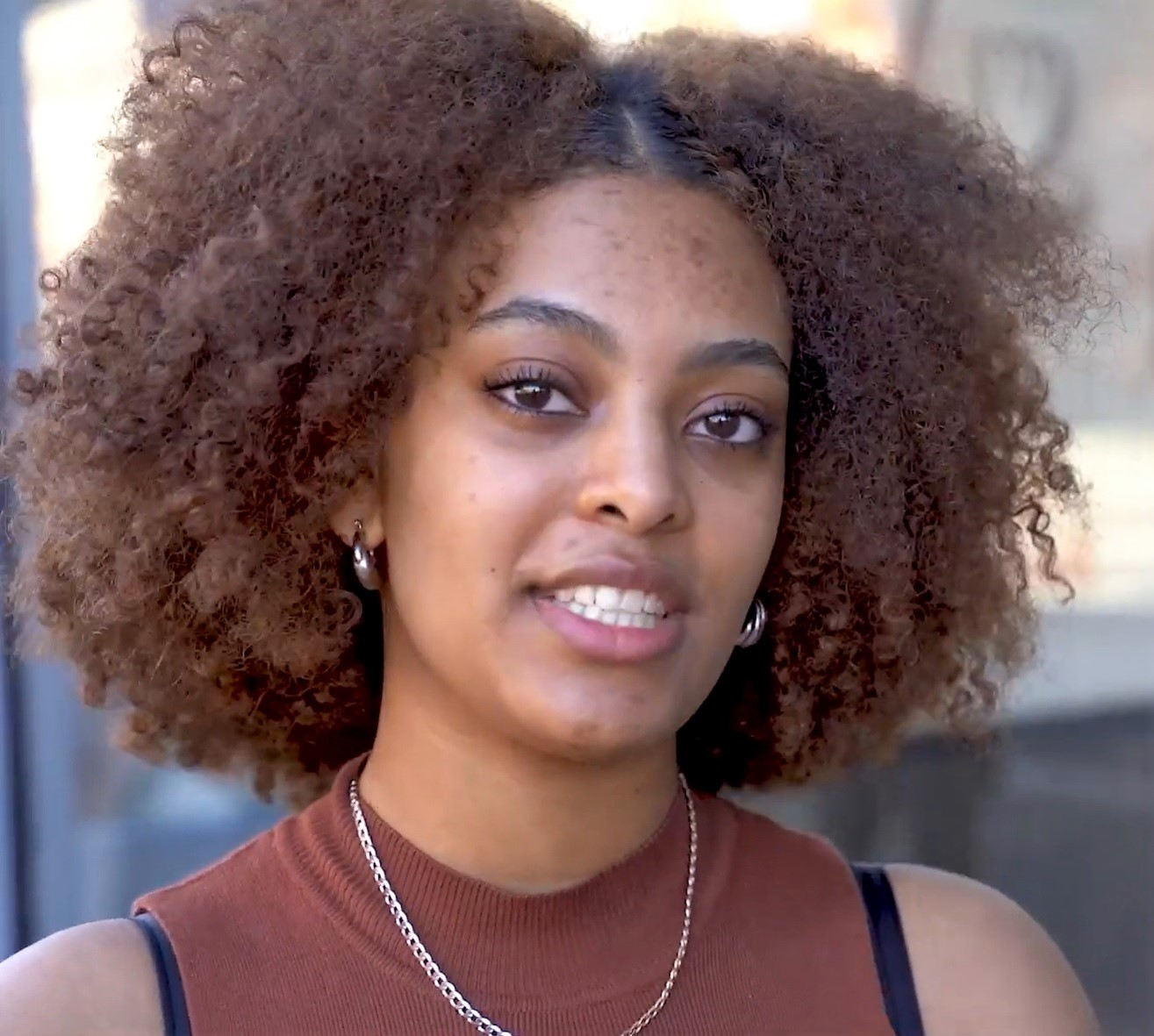
- Adane speaks to the British Library in 2021
- Education: Grey Coat Hospital academy school
- Organization: Bite Back 2030
- Known for: Starting campaign for child hunger in the UK; with Marcus Rashford ensuring free school meals are given in holidays
- Honours: BBC 100 Women 2020

Christina Adane is a British social campaigner responsible for the campaign to feed disadvantaged children who were entitled to school meals free of charge in term-time but not provided for (at all) in the summer holidays, and so at risk of hunger. This campaign was given a high profile by footballer Marcus Rashford and as a result the UK government changed its policy in 2020. Adane was one of the BBC's 100 Women of 2020, "the hundred most inspiring and influential women in the world".

== Biography ==
Adane attended Grey Coat Hospital, an academy school in Westminster, London. Like Marcus Rashford, the footballer, Adane had been a recipient of free school meals, and so was a strong campaigner for ending child hunger in Britain, and wanted to ensure that free meals essential to disadvantaged children in term time would not be withdrawn during the school holidays.

Her campaigning began at school when she was only 11 years old with a pyjama and baking fund-raiser for the Ebola Crisis.

Adane is the youth board co-chair of Bite Back 2030, an organisation that aims to empower young people in leading the campaign against the injustices in the current food system and the right of the next generation to healthy food. During the lockdown for the coronavirus pandemic, Adane answered questions on the BBC News, about the research this organisation carried out with Guy's and St.Thomas's Charity and 1000 teenagers, into lockdown "snacking" diet and family meals.

Having started a rapidly growing petition on behalf of the 1.4million children in the UK who rely on free school meals outside of term-time, which attracted 100,000 signatures in a week, her petition ended up being supported by more than 430,000 signatures. She has spoken on the right of every child to food and on this petition (after the UK Parliament had voted against extending free school meals during the pandemic), for example, at the WE Day with celebrity chef Jamie Oliver, and at other youth empowerment events such as the Power of Youth Festival, which showcases youth activists and has 1000 partner organisations with aims to change the way that young people are viewed by society.

Adane's campaign was supported by Marcus Rashford. Adane was recognised for her work when she was included in the BBC's 100 Women. Rashford was credited with forcing the government to re-think its funding of school meals, but it was Adane who was behind the campaign. She has supported moves for more nutritious meals in schools so that 'no child grows up in a food desert'.
