= Convent of the Epiphany =

Alverton House
- Location within Cornwall
- 50.266441°N 5.043787°W
- Location: Truro, Cornwall, England

Listed Building – Grade II*
- Official name: Alverton Manor Hotel
- Designated: 10 December 1984
- Reference no.: 1282635

The Convent of the Epiphany, Truro, Cornwall, UK, was the home of the Community of the Epiphany (1883–2001). The founder of this community was George Wilkinson, Bishop of Truro. The sisters were involved in pastoral and educational work, the care of Truro Cathedral and St Paul's Church, and church needlework. The order was led for several decades by Mother Julian (Warrender) (1827-1911) who was an inspiration to, and close correspondent of, Ottoline Morrell.

== Branch houses and foundations ==
The convent opened daughter houses in the Penzance, Newquay, and in addition to the mother house, Truro. The sisters also ran a convalescent home in St Agnes, and a small school (Rosewin School) and a retreat house (St Michael's House) in Truro.

In 1936, the sisters founded the Community of Nazareth, in Tokyo, Japan, which achieved full independence around 1960 under the jurisdiction of the Anglican Church in Japan, the Nippon Sei Ko Kai. This community, in turn, founded a daughter house on the island of Okinawa.

== Alverton House ==
The Convent of the Epiphany was originally in the parish of St Paul at Alverton House, Tregolls Road, Truro, an early 19th-century house and a grade II* listed building since 1984. Alverton House and grounds was put up for auction on 26 April 1881 by Jane Tweedy, the widow of William Mansell Tweedy. It was described as a residential property, enclosed within a ring fence. There were thirteen bedrooms and dressing rooms, a spacious drawing room, dining and morning rooms, library, hall and conservatory, kitchen and offices. There was also 12 acres (4.9 ha) of lawns, shrubberies, pleasure, kitchen and allotment gardens, and five cottages. Bidding for the property ended at £5,700, which failed to meet the reserve price of £6,500 and it was later sold to Mr Pascoe of Essex (formerly of Helston) for £6,200.

The house was extended for the convent with the addition of a bell tower, a main entrance, and a north wing to provide additional accommodation for the nuns. The chapel was built in 1908-1910 by Edmund H. Sedding. The west wing is coeval with the chapel and may also be by Sedding.

== Copeland Court ==
Copeland Court
- Location within Cornwall
- 50.27257°N 5.05904°W
- Location: Truro, Cornwall, England

Listed Building – Grade II
- Official name: Epiphany House
- Designated: 29 December 1950
- Reference no.: 1205448

In 1983, because of a decline in vocations, Alverton House was sold and the twelve remaining nuns moved to Copeland Court in Kenwyn. Alverton House is now a hotel.

In 2001, the last two remaining nuns moved out of Copeland Court and the Community of the Epiphany legally ceased to exist. In 2002, Copeland Court was renamed as the Epiphany House Conference and Retreat Centre.

In 2008, Sr Elizabeth CE attracted some attention in the local and national press as the last surviving member of the order; she was then 92 and living in a nursing home in Devon, but still engaged in charitable work. In 2017, Sr Elizabeth died at the age of 101.

== See also ==
- Vincent Coles (1845 – 1929) – warden of the Convent of the Epiphany
