= Church Commissioners =

Body managing Church of England properties

Church Commissioners for England
- Predecessor: Ecclesiastical Commissioners; Queen Anne's Bounty
- Formation: 2 April 1948; 78 years ago
- Type: Asset Management
- Legal status: Registered charity
- Headquarters: Church House, Westminster, London
- Region served: England
- Members: 33
- Secretary and Chief Executive: Rosie Slater-Carr
- First Church Estates Commissioner: Alan Smith
- Second Church Estates Commissioner: Marsha de Cordova
- Third Church Estates Commissioner: Sir Robert Buckland
- Parent organization: General Synod of the Church of England
- Budget: £285,802,166 (2017)
- Endowment: £9.966 billion (As at 31 December 2024)
- Staff: 66
- Website: www.churchofengland.org/about/leadership-and-governance/church-commissioners

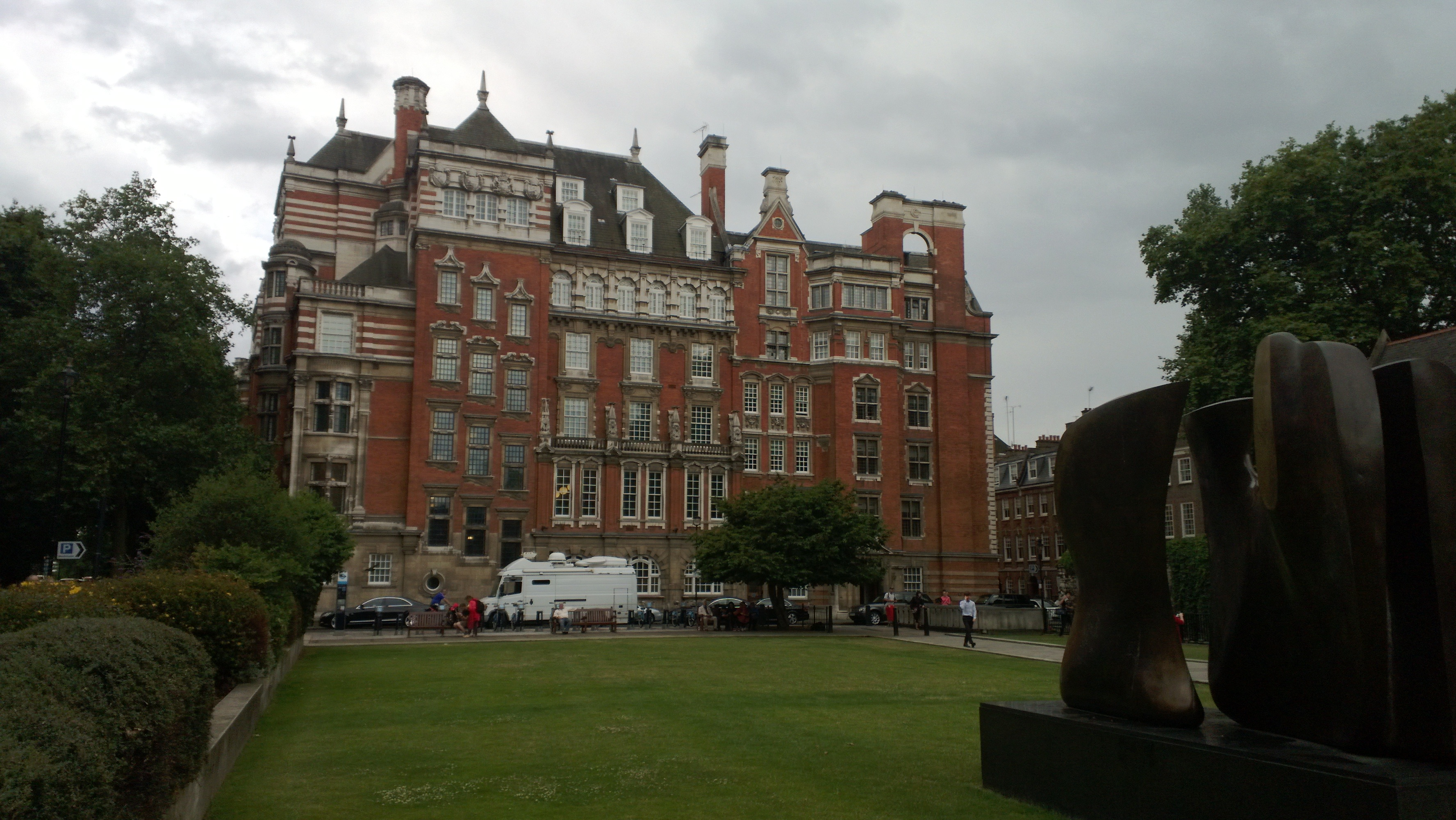
No. 1 Millbank, built for the Church Commissioners by W. D. Caröe (1903)

The Church Commissioners is a body which administers the assets of the Church of England. It was established in 1948 and combined the assets of Queen Anne's Bounty, a fund dating from 1704 for the relief of poor clergy, and of the Ecclesiastical Commissioners formed in 1836. The Church Commissioners is a registered charity regulated by the Charity Commission for England and Wales, and is liable for the payment of pensions to retired clergy whose pensions were accrued before 1998 (subsequent pensions are the responsibility of the Church of England Pensions Board).

The secretary (and chief executive) of the Church Commissioners is Rosie Slater-Carr.

== History ==
=== 19th century ===
The Church Building Act 1818 granted money and established the Church Building Commission to build churches in the cities of the Industrial Revolution. These churches became known variously as Commissioners' churches, Waterloo churches or Million Act churches. The Church Building Commission became the Ecclesiastical Commissioners in 1836.

An earlier Ecclesiastical Duties and Revenues Commission had been set up under the first brief administration of Sir Robert Peel in 1835 with a wide remit, "to consider the State of the Established Church in England and Wales, with reference to Ecclesiastical Duties and Revenues"; this body redistributed wealth between the dioceses and changed diocesan boundaries, and the permanent Ecclesiastical Commission was formed the following year.

=== 20th century ===
The Church Commissioners was established in 1948 as a merger of Queen Anne's Bounty and the Ecclesiastical Commissioners, following the passage, by the National Assembly of the Church of England, of the Church Commissioners Measure 1947 (10 & 11 Geo. 6. No. 2).

In 1992 it was revealed that the Church Commissioners had lost £500m through over-commitment of the fund leading to poor investment decisions. This figure was later revised up to £800m, a third of its assets.

=== 21st century ===
The value of the commissioners' assets was around £5.5 billion as at the end of 2012. By December 2025, it was valued at £11.6 billion. The income is used for the payment of pensions to retired clergy whose pensions were accrued before 1998 (subsequent pensions are the responsibility of the Church of England Pensions Board) and a range of other commitments including supporting the ministries of bishops and cathedrals and funding various diocesan and parish missions initiatives.

In June 2022, the Commissioners acknowledged early links of Queen Anne's Bounty to the Atlantic slave trade. They and Justin Welby, the then Archbishop of Canterbury, apologised. In January 2023 the Commissioners announced that they were setting up a fund of £100 million to be spent over the next nine years on addressing historic links with slavery.

The Commissioners also oversees pastoral reorganisation, the consent of the commissioners being required for establishing or dissolving team and group ministries, uniting, creating, or dissolving benefices and parishes, and the closing of consecrated church buildings and graveyards.

The Church Commissioners is now based at Church House, Westminster, London, having long occupied No. 1 Millbank. The Millbank building was sold in 2005 to the House of Lords for accommodation of members and staff; the commissioners completed the move to Church House in 2007. It used to be an exempt charity under English law, and is now a registered charity regulated by the Charity Commission for England and Wales.

== Responsibilities ==
The Church Commissioners has the following responsibilities:

- Funding mission in churches, dioceses and cathedrals.
- Pastoral reorganisation (including mergers of parishes and benefices); supported by the Pastoral Team.
- Clergy payroll ensuring clergy are paid their stipend.
- Managing the production of Crockford's Clerical Directory.
- Managing the Lambeth Palace Library and the Church of England Record Centre.

== Endowment Fund ==
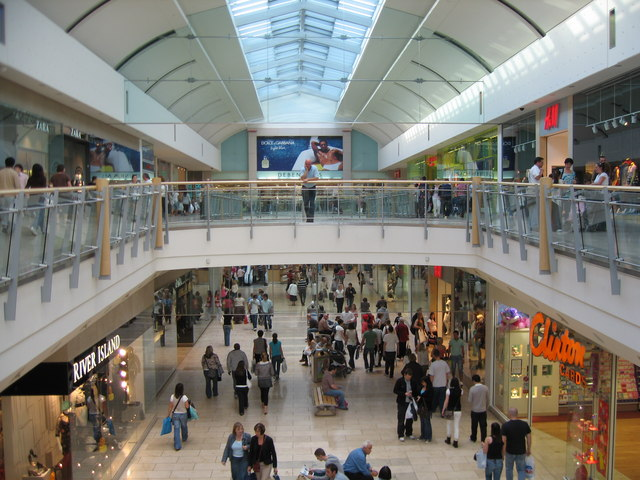
The MetroCentre in Gateshead is one of the largest CC investments

The Church Commissioners Endowment Fund (CCEF) portfolio is extensive, worth around £11.6 billion at end 2025, and includes the Hyde Park Estate and a 10% stake in the MetroCentre shopping centre in Gateshead. The CCEF is the 13th largest landowner in the UK. The CCEF owns a significant amount of rural land and sometimes promotes this through Local Plan processes.

=== Project Spire ===
The slavery reparations fund is known as Project Spire to be taken from the Endowment Fund, and is because of historical links from Queen Anne's Bounty to the South Sea Company and also because the Bounty had also received benefactions from people "likely" to have been "linked" to it. Critics such as Professor Richard Dale, author of The First Crash: Lessons from the South Sea Bubble, term the history "bogus". He writes that: "in the light of recent academic research it is now clear beyond doubt that the Commissioners’ historical analysis is deeply flawed and their conclusions mistaken. The Commissioners therefore have a moral responsibility to withdraw their report and correct the record before a false historical narrative, to which they have lent their full authority, becomes further embedded in Google, AI and in schools and colleges throughout the world." As of July 2026 Project Spire faces a legal hurdle.

In October 2026 the monarch appeared to have excluded reparations.

== List of commissioners ==
There are 33 Church Commissioners, of whom 27 make up the board of governors as the main policy-making body, with a further six who are officers of state or Government ministers. Board members are either elected by the General Synod of the Church of England, or appointed by either the archbishops or the Crown. The board of governors is composed of all of the commissioners apart from the First Lord of the Treasury, the Lord President of the council, the Lord Chancellor, the Secretary of State for Culture, Media and Sport, the Speaker of the House of Commons, and the Lord Speaker.

List of Church Commissioners as of July 2026
Type	Constituency	Name	Start
Archbishops (ex officio)	Archbishop of Canterbury; Chair of the Church Commissioners	Dame Sarah Mullally	2026
Archbishops (ex officio)	Archbishop of York	Stephen Cottrell	2020
Appointed by the Crown	First Church Estates Commissioner	Alan Smith	2021
Appointed by the Crown	Second Church Estates Commissioner	Marsha de Cordova	2024
Appointed by the Archbishop of Canterbury	Third Church Estates Commissioner	Sir Robert Buckland	2025
Elected by General Synod	Four bishops elected by the House of Bishops from among their number.	Pete Wilcox	2024
Elected by General Synod	Four bishops elected by the House of Bishops from among their number.	Philip North	2025
Elected by General Synod	Four bishops elected by the House of Bishops from among their number.	Graham Usher	2021
Elected by General Synod	Four bishops elected by the House of Bishops from among their number.	Rose Hudson-Wilkin	2026
Elected by General Synod	Three other Clerks in Holy Orders elected by the members of the House of Clergy other than the Deans, whether or not those persons are members of that House.	Christopher Smith	2017
Elected by General Synod	Three other Clerks in Holy Orders elected by the members of the House of Clergy other than the Deans, whether or not those persons are members of that House.	Amatu Christian-Iwuagwu	2024
Elected by General Synod	Three other Clerks in Holy Orders elected by the members of the House of Clergy other than the Deans, whether or not those persons are members of that House.	Sarah Geileskey	2024
Elected by General Synod	Four lay persons elected by the House of Laity, whether or not those persons are members of that House.	Richard Denno	2024
Elected by General Synod	Four lay persons elected by the House of Laity, whether or not those persons are members of that House.	Robert Zampetti	2024
Elected by General Synod	Four lay persons elected by the House of Laity, whether or not those persons are members of that House.	Nick Land	
Elected by General Synod	Four lay persons elected by the House of Laity, whether or not those persons are members of that House.	Cathy Rhodes	2024
Elected by the Deans	Two deans elected by all the deans	Rogers Govender	2022
Elected by the Deans	Two deans elected by all the deans	Mark Bonney	2019
Nominated by the Crown (Note: At least one of the three persons nominated by the Crown and the six persons nominated by the Archbishops jointly must be or have been Counsel to His Majesty.)	Unrestricted appointment	Suzanne Avery	2017
Nominated by the Crown	Unrestricted appointment	Kif Hancock	2023
Nominated by the Crown	Unrestricted appointment	Nigel Timmins	
Nominated by the Archbishops of Canterbury and York acting jointly	Unrestricted appointment	Busola Sodeinde	
Nominated by the Archbishops of Canterbury and York acting jointly	Unrestricted appointment	Dame Kate Barker	2023
Nominated by the Archbishops of Canterbury and York acting jointly	Unrestricted appointment	Morag Ellis	2019
Nominated by the Archbishops of Canterbury and York acting jointly	after consultation with: The Lord Mayors of the Cities of London and York; The Vice Chancellors of the Universities of Oxford and Cambridge; Such other persons as the Archbishops finds appropriate	Jenny Buck	2023
Nominated by the Archbishops of Canterbury and York acting jointly	after consultation with: The Lord Mayors of the Cities of London and York; The Vice Chancellors of the Universities of Oxford and Cambridge; Such other persons as the Archbishops finds appropriate	Remi Olu-Pitan	2022
Nominated by the Archbishops of Canterbury and York acting jointly	after consultation with: The Lord Mayors of the Cities of London and York; The Vice Chancellors of the Universities of Oxford and Cambridge; Such other persons as the Archbishops finds appropriate	Cyrus Gentry	2025
Officers of State (Ex officio Church Commissioners, but not members of the Board of Governors)	First Lord of the Treasury	Andy Burnham	2026
Officers of State (Ex officio Church Commissioners, but not members of the Board of Governors)	Lord President of the Council	Sir Alan Campbell	2025
Officers of State (Ex officio Church Commissioners, but not members of the Board of Governors)	Lord High Chancellor of Great Britain	Alex Norris	2026
Officers of State (Ex officio Church Commissioners, but not members of the Board of Governors)	Speaker of the House of Commons	Sir Lindsay Hoyle	2019
Officers of State (Ex officio Church Commissioners, but not members of the Board of Governors)	Lord Speaker	The Lord McFall of Alcluith	2026
Officers of State (Ex officio Church Commissioners, but not members of the Board of Governors)	Secretary of State for Culture, Media and Sport	Lisa Nandy	2024

== Church Estates Commissioners ==
The Church Estates Commissioners are three lay people who represent the Church Commissioners in the General Synod of the Church of England. The first and second commissioners are appointed by the British monarch, and the third commissioner is appointed by the Archbishop of Canterbury. They are based at Church House, Westminster, having previously had offices at No. 1 Millbank, London.

=== First Church Estates Commissioners ===
The First Church Estates Commissioner is appointed by the British Monarch.

- 1850–1878: Henry Pelham, 3rd Earl of Chichester
- 1878–1905: Arthur Stanhope, 6th Earl Stanhope
- 1905–1931: Sir Lewis Dibdin
- 1931–1938: Sir George Middleton
- 1939–1954: Sir Philip Baker Wilbraham
- 1954–1969: Malcolm Trustram Eve, 1st Baron Silsoe
- 1969–1982: Sir Ronald Harris
- 1983–1993: Sir Douglas Lovelock
- 1993–1999: Sir Michael Colman, 3rd Baronet
- 1999–2001: John Sclater
- 2002–2017: Sir Andreas Whittam Smith
- 2017–2021: Loretta Minghella
- 2021–present: Alan Smith

=== Second Church Estates Commissioners ===
The Second Church Estates Commissioner is appointed by the Crown. They are now always a Member of Parliament from the party in government, and have additional duties as a link between the British Parliament and the Church.

- 1850–1858: Sir John Shaw Lefevre
- 1858–1859: Charles Shaw-Lefevre, 1st Viscount Eversley
- 1859–1865: Edward Pleydell Bouverie
- 1865–1866: Henry Austin Bruce
- 1866–1868: John Robert Mowbray
- 1869–1874: Sir Thomas Dyke Acland, 11th Baronet
- 1874–1879: George Cubitt
- 1879–1880: Thomas Salt
- 1880–1885: Evelyn Ashley
- 1885–1886: Sir Henry Selwin-Ibbetson
- 1886–1886: Thomas Dyke Acland
- 1886–1892: Sir Henry Selwin-Ibbetson
- 1892–1892: Charles Algernon Whitmore
- 1892–1895: George Leveson Gower
- 1895–1906: Sir Lees Knowles
- 1906–1906: Francis Stevenson
- 1906–1907: Charles Hobhouse
- 1907–1910: James Tomkinson
- 1910–1918: Sir Charles Nicholson
- 1919–1922: Sir William Mount, 1st Baronet
- 1923–1924: John Birchall
- 1924–1924: George Middleton
- 1924–1929: John Birchall
- 1929–1931: George Middleton
- 1931–1943: Richard Denman
- 1943–1945: Sir John Mills
- 1945–1950: Thomas Burden
- 1950–1951: Sir Richard Acland
- 1951–1957: Sir John Crowder
- 1957–1962: Sir Hubert Ashton
- 1962–1964: Sir John Arbuthnot, 1st Baronet
- 1964–1970: Lancelot Mallalieu
- 1970–1974: Sir Marcus Worsley, 5th Baronet
- 1974–1974: Edward Bishop
- 1974–1979: Terence Walker
- 1979–1987 Sir William van Straubenzee
- 1987–1997: Michael Alison
- 1997–2010: Sir Stuart Bell
- 2010–2015: Sir Tony Baldry
- 2015–2019: Dame Caroline Spelman
- 2020–2024: Andrew Selous
- 2024–present: Marsha de Cordova

=== Third Church Estates Commissioners ===
The Third Church Estates Commissioner is appointed by the Archbishop of Canterbury.

- 1850–1856: Henry Goulburn
- 1856–1858: Spencer Horatio Walpole
- 1858–1862: William Deedes
- 1862–1866: Spencer Horatio Walpole
- 1866–1871: Edward Howes
- 1871–1892: Sir John Mowbray, 1st Baronet
- 1892–1895: Sir Michael Hicks Beach, 9th Baronet
- 1895–1926: Charles Stuart-Wortley, 1st Baron Stuart of Wortley
- 1926–1948: Herbert Pease, 1st Baron Daryngton
- 1948–1952: John Tovey, 1st Baron Tovey
- 1952–1954: Sir Malcolm Eve, 1st Baronet
- 1954–1962: Sir James Brown
- 1962–1972: Sir Hubert Ashton
- 1972–1981: Dame Betty Ridley
- 1981–1989: Betsy Howarth
- 1989–1999: Margaret Heather Laird
- 1999–2005: Gillian Joynson-Hicks, Viscountess Brentford
- 2006–2012: Timothy Walker
- 2013–2018: Andrew Mackie
- 2018–2022: Eve Poole
- 2022–2024: Canon Flora Winfield
- 2025–present: Sir Robert Buckland

== See also ==
- Allchurches Trust
- Churches Conservation Trust
