= Richard Daley =

Richard Daley may refer to:

- Richard J. Daley (1902–1976), mayor of Chicago (1955–1976), father of Richard M. Daley
- Richard M. Daley (born 1942), mayor of Chicago (1989–2011), son of Richard J. Daley

== See also ==
- Richard Daly (1758–1813), Irish actor and theatrical manager
- Richard J. Daly, American business executive
- Richard Dalley, American figure skater
- Dick Daley (1910–1984), Australian rugby league footballer
