= Flora Winfield =

British Anglican bishop, military chaplain, diplomat and author

The Right Reverend Flora Winfield DL
- Bishop of Selby
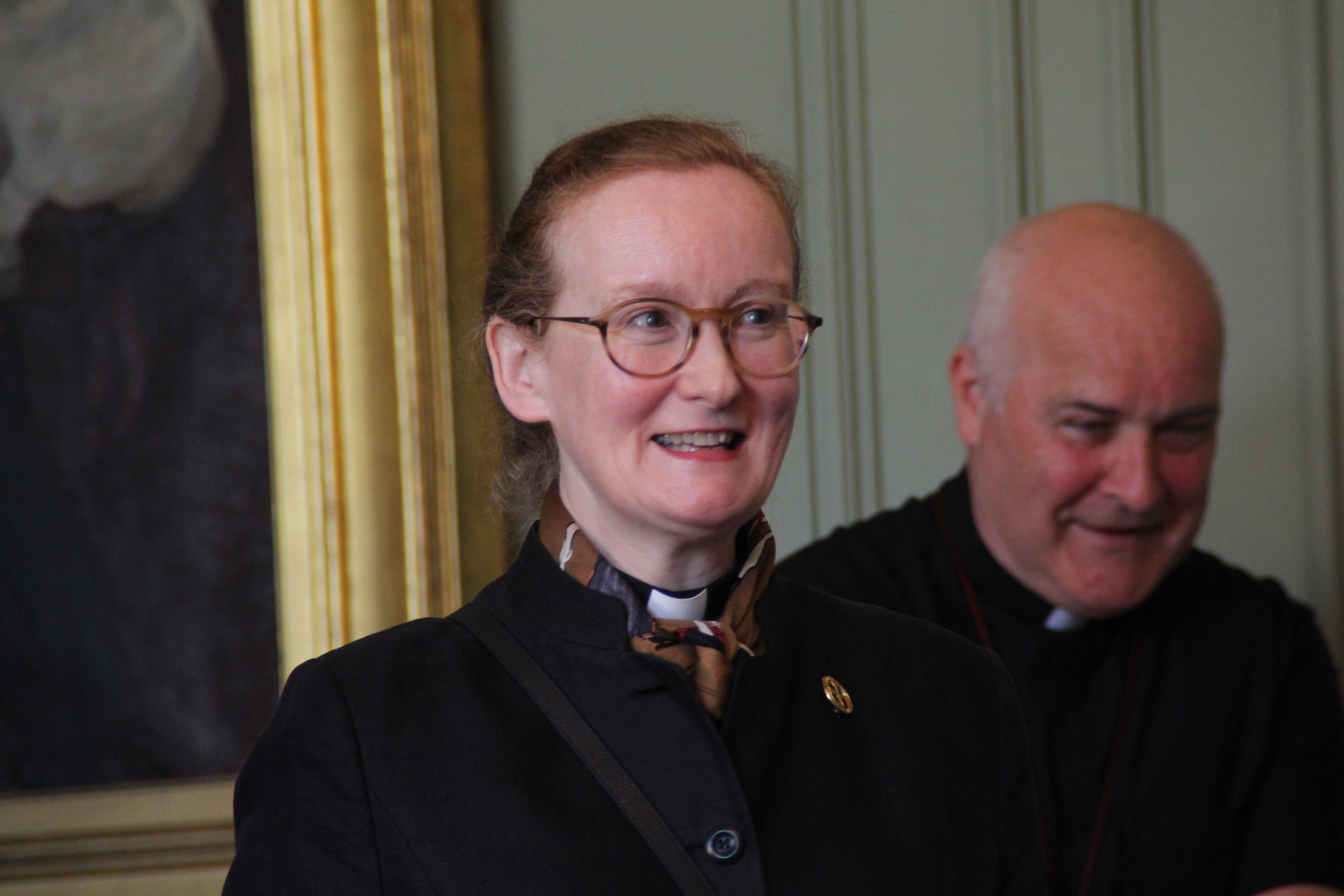
- Winfield (left) in 2024
- Church: Church of England
- Diocese: Diocese of York
- In office: October 2024 to present
- Predecessor: John Thomson
- Other post: Third Church Estates Commissioner (2022–2024)

Orders
- Ordination: 1989 (deacon); 1994 (priest)
- Consecration: 10 October 2024 by Stephen Cottrell

Personal details
- Born: Flora Jane Louise Winfield; 1964 (age 61–62)
- Denomination: Anglicanism
- Spouse: Jonathan Gough (before 1985)
- Education: St David's University College, Lampeter; Ripon College Cuddesdon

Flora Jane Louise Winfield DL (born 1964) is a British Anglican bishop, military chaplain, diplomat, and author. Since 2024, she has been Bishop of Selby. From 2022 to 2024, she was the Third Church Estates Commissioner. She has worked in parish ministry, including as priest-in-charge of St Mary-at-Hill, City of London (2008–2014), and in academia as chaplain and tutor at Mansfield College, Oxford (1994–1997). Before taking up her current appointment, she held a number of diplomatic posts including Anglican Communion Permanent Representative to the United Nations (2014–2017) and as Archbishop of Canterbury's Special Representative to the Commonwealth (2017–2019), and was then Archbishop of Canterbury's Advisor for Reconciliation (2019–2022).

== Early life and education ==
Winfield was born in 1964. She was educated at Portsmouth High School, an all-girls independent school in Southsea, Portsmouth. She studied at St David's University College, Lampeter, graduating with a Bachelor of Arts (BA) degree in 1985.

== Career ==
From 1986 to 1987, Winfield was a lay worker at Christchurch Abbeydale in Gloucester. She then trained for ordination at Ripon College Cuddesdon between 1987 and 1989. She was ordained in the Church of England as a deacon in 1989. She was then parish deacon at Christ Church, Stantonbury in the Diocese of Oxford for the next three years. From 1992 to 1994, she was "County Ecumenical Officer" for the county of Gloucestershire, supporting local ecumenism as part of Churches Together in England.

In 1994, Winfield was ordained as a priest. She was then assistant chaplain and tutor of Mansfield College, Oxford, before becoming National Ecumenical Officer for the Church of England in 1997. She was installed as a residentiary canon of Winchester Cathedral in September 2002, serving the cathedral for the next three years as its canon pastor.

In 2005, Winfield moved to New York, United States, having been appointed assistant secretary general of Religions for Peace. She then returned to the United Kingdom and held a number of concurrent appointments: she was secretary for international affairs for Churches Together in Britain and Ireland (2006–2009), Archbishop of Canterbury's secretary for Anglican relations (2007–2014), and a parish post as priest-in-charge of St Mary-at-Hill in Diocese of London (2008–2014).

In 2014, Winfield was appointed as the Anglican Communion's permanent representative to the United Nations. She was also held permission to officiate in the Diocese of London from 2015 to 2024. She became the Archbishop of Canterbury's special representative to the Commonwealth in 2017. From 2019 to 2022, she was the Archbishop of Canterbury's adviser on reconciliation. From 2019 to 2024, she also held permission to officiate in the Diocese of Leeds. On 1 February 2022, she became the Third Church Estates Commissioner.

Since March 2011, she has been a Deputy Lieutenant (DL) to the Lord-Lieutenant of Greater London.

=== Military service ===
On 22 July 1997, Winfield was commissioned in the British Army as a chaplain to the forces 4th class (equivalent in rank to captain) in the Royal Army Chaplains' Department, Territorial Army. She was promoted to chaplain to the forces 3rd class (equivalent to major) on 15 November 2005, and to chaplain to the forces 2nd class (equivalent to lieutenant colonel) on 5 October 2015. She attended the Advanced Command and Staff Course at the Defence Academy of the United Kingdom in 2016.

=== Episcopal ministry ===
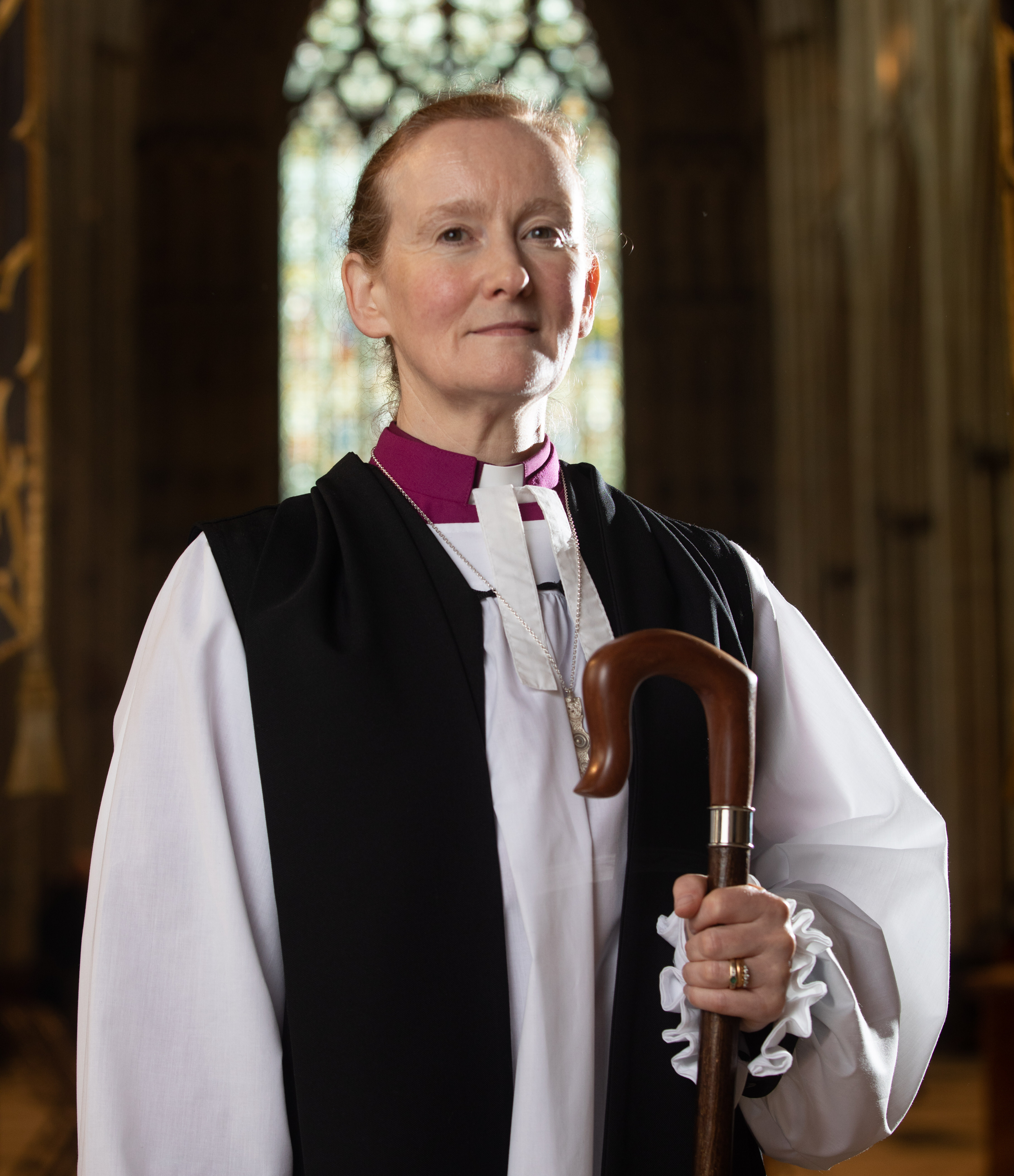
Winfield on the day of consecration, 2024

On 31 July 2024, Winfield was announced as the next Bishop of Selby, a suffragan bishop in the Diocese of York. She was formally nominated in September 2024. On 10 October 2024, she was consecrated as a bishop by Stephen Cottrell, Archbishop of York, during a service at York Minster.

== Personal life ==
Since 1985, she has been married to Jonathan Gough.
