= Timothy Walker (civil servant) =

Timothy Edward Hanson Walker, CB (born 27 July 1945) is a British retired senior civil servant. He served as Director General of the Immigration and Nationality Directorate from 1995 to 1998, and Director General of the Health and Safety Executive from 2000 to 2005. Then, from 2006 to 2012, he was the Third Church Estates Commissioner, one of the most senior lay people in the Church of England.

== Personal life ==
In 1969, Walker married Judith Mann; she died in 1976. Together they had one daughter. In 1983, he married Anna née Butterworth. Together they have two daughters.

== Honours ==
In the 1998 Queen's Birthday Honours, Walker was appointed a Companion of the Order of the Bath (CB) in recognition of his service as Director-General of the Immigration and Nationality Directorate.
