= Richard Dale (economist) =

Richard Dale (born 1943) is an economist, lawyer and historian who has been credited with anticipating the 2008 financial crisis.

== Biography ==
Educated at Marlborough College, Dale graduated from the London School of Economics in 1965. He subsequently qualified as a barrister at Lincoln's Inn and was later awarded a PhD in Law and Economics by the University of Kent. In 1969 Dale became founder and editor of International Currency Review, a journal specialising in global financial markets which continued in publication (under new ownership from 1973) for the next forty years. After a brief spell as a journalist on the Financial Times, Dale worked for N.M. Rothschild (1973 to 1977), where he was appointed an assistant director of Rothschild Asset Management.

In 1979 Dale became lecturer in finance at the University of Bath. He held a Rockefeller Foundation International Relations Fellowship in 1981/83 and was affiliated with the Brookings Institution in Washington DC, where he was a consultant to the Group of Thirty and testified before Congressional committees on the Latin American debt crisis. In 1989 he was appointed Professor of International Banking at Southampton University, where he remained until his retirement in 2002.

In 1994 Dale was a senior Houblon-Norman Fellow at the Bank of England; from 1993 to 2002 he was a visiting professorial fellow at Queen Mary and Westfield College, London University; and from 1993 to 2009 he was a visiting professor at University of Reading. From 1999 to 2002 he was a member of the European Shadow Financial Regulatory Committee and a board member of the European Capital Markets Institute, representing European business schools.

Outside his academic work Dale was a consultant to the Banking Association of South Africa and to several City institutions, including N.M. Rothschild and the Corporation of London. He was an adviser to the UK Treasury and to the House of Commons Treasury and Civil Service Committee and an expert witness on behalf of the Irish Competition Authority. From 1990 to 2007 Dale was co-founder and co-editor (with Professor Steve Thomas) of two quarterly credit rating services: FT Credit Ratings International and FT Credit Ratings in Emerging Markets.

== Research ==
Dale has sole authored five books and over 40 journal articles on international finance and banking. His book "International Banking Deregulation – the Great Banking Experiment" (1992) predicted that the dismantling of barriers between commercial and investment banking could precipitate a 1929-style global financial meltdown while his book "The First Crash: Lessons from the South Sea Bubble" (2004) used financial history to challenge the rational expectations assumptions of modern finance theory.

In his retirement, Dale has written two books and several journal articles on historical subjects ranging from the downfall of Sir Walter Raleigh to medieval pilgrimage. He was elected a Fellow of The Royal Historical Society in 2014.

In 2026, Dale's essay, "How the Church Commissioners relied on bogus history to denounce their predecessors and vilify their own Church," appeared on History Reclaimed, the website founded by Cambridge University Professor Emeritus of French History Robert Tombs. The web publication argues that demands for enslavement reparations result in "nihilistic destruction [...] damaging to democracy and to a free society." According to the BBC, Dale's research has stalled the work of the Church of England's Project Spire, "a £100m fund aimed at making amends, primarily by investing in communities affected by the legacy of slavery in the UK, Africa and the Caribbean."

== Selected Short Works ==
- Dale, R.S. Bank Supervision Around the World, Group of Thirty, New York, 1982, pp. 74.
- Dale, R.S. and Mattione, R. Managing Global Debt, Brookings Institution, Washington DC, 1983, pp. 50.
- Dale, R.S. (with S.H. Thomas). The Role of Credit Ratings in the Basel Capital Adequacy Proposals, ECMI Short Paper No. 2, December 2000, pp. 76.

== Selected Journal Articles ==
- Dale, R.S. Reflections on the BCCI Affair, The International Lawyer (US), Winter 1992, pp. 949 – 961.
- Dale, R.S. The London Clearing House: Managing Risk in Derivatives Markets, Banking and Finance Law Review, 13 (2), 1998, pp. 434 – 453.
- Dale, R.S. and Wolfe, Simon. The Structure of Financial Regulation, Journal of Financial Regulation and Compliance, December 1998 (paper presented at World Bank Conference, El Salvador, July 1998), pp. 326–350.
- Dale, R.S. Risk Management and Public Policy in Clearing, Payment and Settlement Systems, International Finance (Blackwells) December 1998, pp. 229 – 259.
- Dale, R.S. Deposit Insurance in Theory and Practice, Journal of Financial Regulation and Compliance, February 2000, pp. 36 – 56.
- Dale, R.S., Johnson, J., and Tang, L. Financial Markets Can Go Mad: Evidence from the South Sea Bubble, Economic History Review, May 2005, pp. 233 – 271.
- Dale, R.S., Johnson, J., and Tang, L. Pitfalls in the Quest for South Sea Rationality, Economic History Review, May 2007, pp. 766 – 772.
- Dale, R.S. (with Bell, A.). The Medieval Pilgrimage Business, Enterprise and Society, September 2011, pp. 601 – 627.
- Dale, R.S. The Death of an Alleged Heretic, Richard Hunne (d. 1514), Explained, Reformation and Renaissance Review, July 2013, pp. 133–153.

== Books ==
- Dale, R.S. Anti-dumping Law in a Liberal Trade Order, Macmillan Press, 1979, St Martin's Press USA, 1980, pp. 237.
- Dale, R.S. The Regulation of International Banking, Woodhead-Faulkner, 1984 and Prentice-Hall USA, 1985, pp. 208.
- Dale, R.S. International Banking Deregulation: The Great Banking Experiment, Blackwells, 1992, pp. 211.
- Dale, R.S. Risk and Regulation in Global Securities Markets, Chichester, John Wiley 1996, pp. 342 (Chinese edition, Science and Culture Publishing House, Hong Kong, 1999).
- Dale, R.S. The First Crash: lessons from the South Sea Bubble, Princeton University Press, 2004, pp. 194.
- Dale, R.S. Napoleon is Dead! Lord Cochrane and the Great Stock Exchange Scandal, Sutton Publishing, 2006, pp. 240.
- Dale, R.S. Who killed Sir Walter Ralegh? History Press, 2011, pp. 190.
