= Pavel Kalný =

Czech mountain climber (1967–2006)

- Born: 14 May 1967; Czech Republic
- Died: 10 May 2006 (aged 38); Lhotse
- Cause of death: Exposure, internal injures from fall
- Resting place: Lhotse
- Occupation: Psychiatrist
- Organization: Český horolezecký svaz
- Known for: Casualty of one the most deadly seasons on Mount Everest
- Children: 2

Pavel Kalný (14 May 1967 – 10 May 2006) was a Czech psychiatrist and mountaineer. He climbed Mount Elbrus in 1992 and also on several mountains in the USSR. In 2005 he climbed the entire massif of Mount Logan, Canada's highest peak.

In 2006, together with his friend Martin Minařík, he joined the Norwegian Lhotse Expedition team to climb Lhotse, the fourth highest mountain in the world. It would be his first attempt at an eight-thousander. Eventually, only Kalný and Minařík would climb together in a lean style, without sherpas or porters.

On 9 May 2006, Minařík climbed ahead to Camp IV. Kalný, climbing behind, fell about 200 meters, but survived, experiencing internal injuries. Trapped on the mountain, he was found the next day by a Chilean climbing team led by Rodrigo Jordan who stayed with him until he died of exposure.

He was the 11th person to die on Everest and Lhotse in less than 30 days, in one of the most fatal seasons on the mountain.

After Kalný's death, Czech sculptor Otmar Oliva created a commemorative monument in his memory. In April 2007, Martin Minařík placed it on Lhotse.

== See also ==
- List of people who died climbing Mount Everest
