= Zdeněk Hrubý =

Czech mountaineer, economist and public administrator

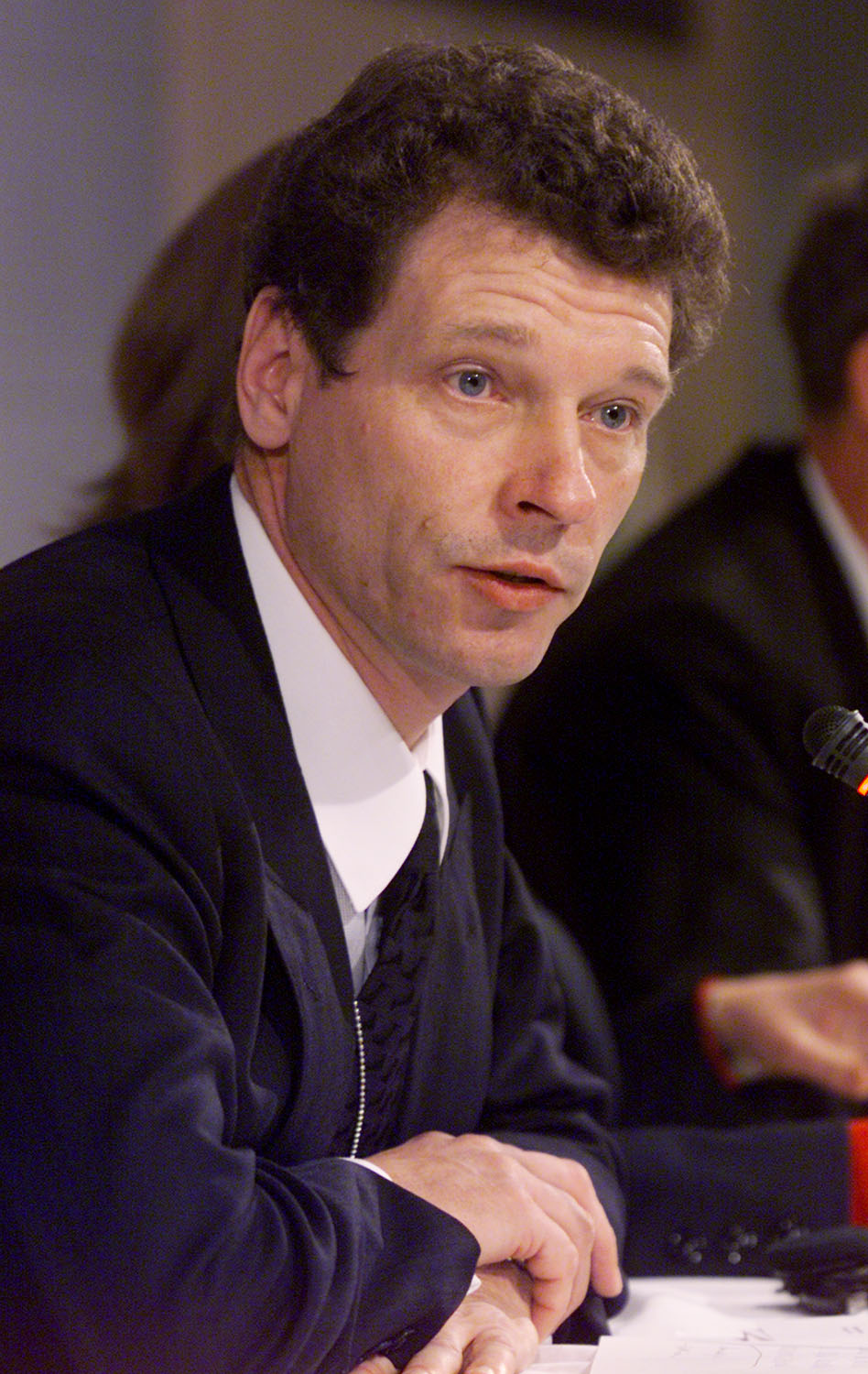
- Zdenék Hrubý
- Born: 9 August 1956; Uherské Hradiště, Czechoslovakia
- Died: 8 August 2013 (aged 56); Gasherbrum I
- Cause of death: Fall while abseiling
- Education: Czech Technical University in Prague
- Occupations: Mountaineer, professor, economist, public administrator
- Known for: Summiting eight eight-thousanders
- Spouse: Olga Hrubá
- Children: 2

Zdeněk Hrubý (8 August 1956 – 8 August 2013) was a Czech mountaineer, economist and public administrator. Hrubý climbed eight eight-thousanders and was one of the most successful Czech mountaineers of his era.

== Mountaineering ==
Hrubý climbed his first eight-thousander, Cho Oyu in 1994. Over the next two decades, he would return to the Himalayas multiple times for climbing expeditions.

In 2004, he was awarded the ascent of the year for his alpine-style summit of Shishapangma via the MacIntyre route, alongside Radek Jaroš, Martin Minařík, and Petr Mašek. He was awarded his next ascent of the year for his polar crossing of Antarctica and his climb of Mount Vinson.

While climbing Dhaulagiri, he and climbing partner Radek Jaroš were awarded a fair play award for rescuing three climbers during their ascent. They later received a diploma from the European Fair Play Movement.

His most frequent climbing partners were Radek Jaroš and Marek Holeček. In 2009, Hrubý and Holeček's climbing partnership was tested after an attempt to be the first ascent of the southwest face of Gasherbrum I. During the climb, Hrubý's stomach ulcers ruptured. He begged his climbing partner to leave him on the mountain, however they successfully made the descent. They were only 500m from the summit.

In 2011, they attempted the first ascent of the southern Rupal face of Nanga Parbat, which Hrubý had to abandon mid-attempt due to an injured hand and Holeček had to turn back due to poor weather conditions. The next year, they returned to Nanga Parbat, this time successfully summiting via the Kinsofer route. The Czech Mountaineering Association awarded the climb an honorable mention for the year, given the difficult conditions of the summit.

=== Never Stop Exploring expedition series ===
Hrubý and Holeček planned three expeditions for 2013, as part of their Never Stop Exploring expedition series, two in the Himalayas and Mount Foster in Antarctica. They were all mountains they had not successfully conquered before.

The first trip, named Thumba Party resulted in the first successful alpine style summit of the North West pillar of Talung (7349 m) on 19 May. The ascent was later awarded the climb of the year by the Czech Mountaineering Association.

The second expedition brought the pair back to attempt the as yet unclimbed southwest face of Gasherbrum I once again.

=== Death and legacy ===
A day before his 57th birthday, Hrubý died from a fall during the descent of the eight-thousander, after failing to reach the summit. Hrubý was fatally injured after a technical mistake; he mistakenly used the wrong type of carabiner while abseiling and fell several hundred meters to his death.

After his death, Hrubý was commemorated with a memorial at the Hrubá Skála climber's cemetery.

In 2017, his climbing partner Marek Holeček, successfully climbed the Southwest face of Gasherbrum I on his fifth attempt. He dedicated his summit to Hrubý.

== Professional life ==
Hrubý studied cybernetics at Czech Technical University in Prague and later economics in Germany and England. After graduation, he had a successful career in education and administration.

From 2002 to April 2005, he was a Czech deputy minister of finance, responsible for EU integration and the coordinator of EU aid. He additionally served as a government representative for meetings of the International Monetary Fund, and as member of the board of directors of Český Telecom.

At the time of his death, he was the chairman of the Czech Mountaineering Association, a teacher in the Faculty of Social Science of Charles University in Prague, and a visiting professor for Australian National University.

Outside of climbing, he pursued 100 hour skiing races and ultramarathons.

== Climbing history ==
- 1994 Cho Oyu (8201 m), successful summit
- 1996 Mount Everest, no attempt at summit due to weather
- 1997 Gasherbrum I (8068 m), successful summit
- 1997 Gasherbrum II (8035 m), successful summit
- 1998 Mount Everest reached 8600 m
- 1999 Lhotse (8516 m), successful summit
- 2002 Kangchenjunga reached 8050 m
- 2002 K2 reached 5200 m
- 2004 Shishapangma (8013 m), successful summit
- 2007 K2, unsuccessful
- 2007 Broad Peak (8047 m), successful summit
- 2008 Dhaulagiri (8167 m), successful summit
- 2008 Makalu, reached 7200 m
- 2009 Gasherbrum I, unsuccessful summit attempt via Southwest face
- 2012 Nanga Parbat (8125 m), successful summit
- 2013 Talung (7349 m) – first ascent in alpine style with Marek Holeček.

== Bibliography ==
- Kam dolétne sokol, výbor z deníků z výprav do velehor; Zdeněk Hrubý a Boris Hlaváček, ASA 2015, ISBN 978-80-87353-07-3
