= Enrico dal Covolo =

Italian Roman Catholic titular bishop

The Most Reverend Monsignor Enrico dal Covolo SBD
- Rector Emeritus of the Pontifical Lateran University
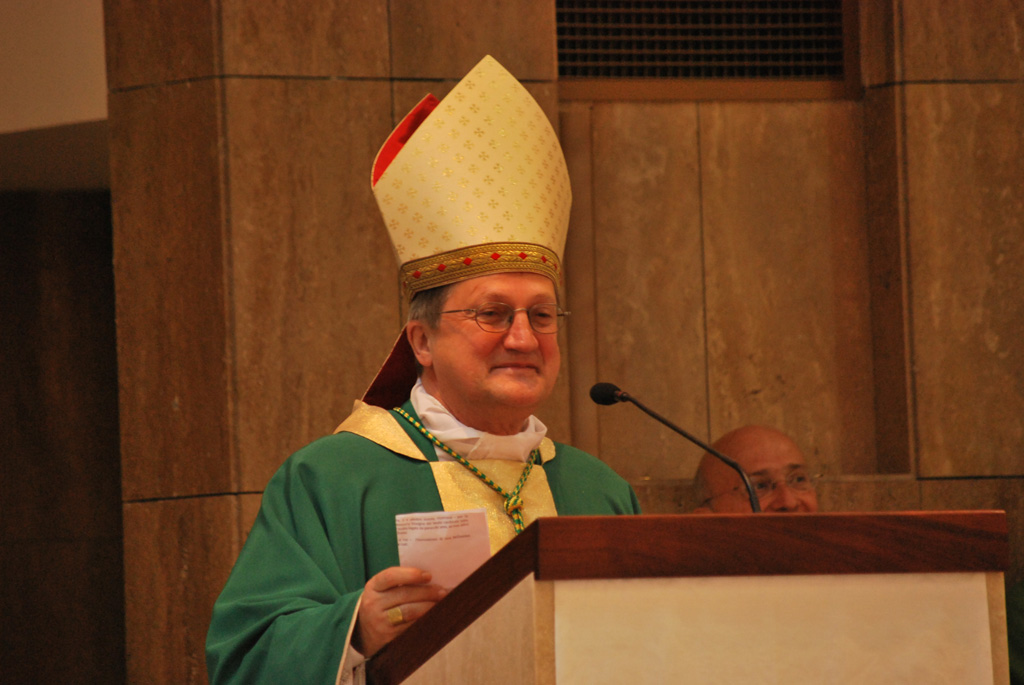
- Appointed: 30 June 2010
- Term ended: 2 June 2018
- Predecessor: Salvatore Fisichella
- Successor: Vincenzo Buonomo
- Other post: Titular Bishop of Heraclea (2010–)
- Previous post: Vice-Rector of the Salesian Pontifical University (2000–03)

Orders
- Ordination: 22 December 1979
- Consecration: 9 October 2010 by Tarcisio Bertone

Personal details
- Born: Enrico dal Covolo; 10 May 1950 (age 76) Feltre, Belluno, Veneto, Italy
- Denomination: Roman Catholic
- Motto: Eritis mihi testes
- Coat of arms

Styles of Enrico dal Covolo
- Reference style: The Most Reverend
- Spoken style: Your Excellency
- Religious style: Bishop

Enrico dal Covolo SDB (born 5 October 1950) is a Catholic bishop and Italian theologian, the Assessor of the Pontifical Committee for Historical Sciences since 15 January 2019. He previously served as the rector of the Pontifical Lateran University from 30 June 2010 to 2 June 2018. He was also the postulator of the cause of canonization of Pope John Paul I from 2003 until 2016.

== Biography ==
Enrico dal Covolo was born in Feltre, Italy. He entered the novitiate of the Salesians of Don Bosco at Albarè and took his first vows on 2 October 1973. He was ordained at age 29, in Milan, on 22 December 1979 as a Salesian.

In 1986, dal Covolo was transferred to the Vice Province of the Salesian Pontifical University in Rome and in the following years held a number of academic appointments there: professor of ancient Christian literature and a specialist in the Fathers of the Church, dean of the faculty of Literature between 1993 and 2000, and between 2000 and 2003 Vice-Rector of the University.

Dal Covolo is a member of the Pontifical Committee for Historical Sciences, a consultor of the Congregation for the Doctrine of the Faith, a member of the Commission dealing with dispensations from priestly obligations, and a consultor of the Congregation for the Clergy.

In 2003, dal Covolo was appointed by the Rector Major of the Salesians, Pascual Chávez, to serve as Postulator General for the Causes of Saints of the Salesian Family. Dal Covolo is the second Salesian on the Commission for Sacred Archaeology- Antonio Baruffa was confirmed for a further five-year period.

From 21 to 27 February 2010, he preached the Lenten retreat to Pope Benedict XVI and the Roman Curia in the Redemptoris Mater chapel. He selected the priestly vocation as the theme of the meditations.

On 30 June 2010, he was appointed rector of the Pontifical Lateran University, in succession to Archbishop Salvatore Fisichella, who had been appointed the first president of the Pontifical Council for the Promotion of the New Evangelisation.

In recognition of his new responsibilities in that post, dal Covolo was appointed titular bishop of Heraclea on 15 September 2010. The Salesian Tarcisio Bertone, Cardinal Secretary of State, was the principal consecrator at his episcopal ordination.

On 18 September 2012, dal Covolo was appointed by Pope Benedict XVI to serve as one of the papally-appointed Synod Fathers for the October 2012 General Assembly of the Synod of Bishops on the New Evangelization.

On 15 January 2019 Pope Francis appointed him Assessor of the Pontifical Committee for Historical Sciences, a new role inside the committee.

== Publications ==
- I Severi e il Cristianesimo
- Chiesa Società Politica. Aree di "laicità" nel cristianesimo delle origini
- I Padri della Chiesa maestri di formazione sacerdotale
- Introduzione ai Padri della Chiesa, voll. 6, 1990-1999
- Lo studio dei Padri della Chiesa oggi, 1991
- La missione del Redentore. Studi sull'Enciclica missionaria di Giovanni Paolo II, 1992
- Per una cultura dell'Europa unita. Lo studio dei Padri della Chiesa oggi, 1992
- Sacerdoti per la nuova evangelizzazione. Studi sull'Esortazione apostolica Pastores dabo vobis di Giovanni Paolo II, 1994
- Chiesa Società Politica. Aree di "laicità" nel cristianesimo delle origini, 1994
- Storia della teologia, 1. Dalle origini a Bernardo di Chiaravalle, (cur.) 1995
- Laici e laicità nei primi secoli della Chiesa, Letture cristiane del primo millennio 21, 1995
- Donna e matrimonio alle origini della Chiesa, 1996
- Cultura e promozione umana. Fondamenti e itinerari, 1996
- La catechesi al traguardo. Studi sul Catechismo della Chiesa Cattolica, 1997
- Eusebio di Vercelli e il suo tempo, 1997
- Sacerdoti come i nostri Padri. I Padri della Chiesa maestri di formazione sacerdotale, 1998
- Cultura e promozione umana. La cura del corpo e dello spirito nell'antichità classica e nei primi secoli cristiani: un magistero ancora attuale?, (cur.) 1998
- Gli Imperatori Severi. Storia Archeologia Religione, (cur.) 1999
- Mosè ci viene letto nella Chiesa. Lettura delle Omelie di Origene sulla Genesi, (cur.) 1999
- La grazia del giubileo. Fra storia teologia e vita, 2000
- Cultura e promozione umana. La cura del corpo e dello spirito dai primi secoli cristiani al Medioevo: contributi e attualizzazioni ulteriori, (cur.) 2001
- Omelie su Geremia. Lettura origeniana, (cur.) 2001
- Chiesa e impero. Da Augusto a Giustiniano, (cur.) 2001
- "Paideia" e "Humanitas". Per la pace nel terzo millennio, in "Rivista di Scienze dell'Educazione", (cur.) 2001
- Omelie sull'Esodo. Lettura origeniana, (cur.) 2002
- Il latino e i cristiani. Un bilancio all'inizio del terzo millennio, (cur.) 2002
- In ascolto della parola, 2002
- Omelie sul Levitico. Lettura origeniana, (cur.) 2003
- Omelie sui numeri. Lettura origeniana, 2004
- Il contributo delle scienze storiche allo studio del Nuovo Testamento. Atti del Convegno, (cur.) 2005
- L'opera di Luca. L'oggi di Dio e l'oggi dell'uomo, 2006
- Attratti dall'amore. Riflessioni sull'Enciclica Deus caritas est di Benedetto XVI, 2006
- Commento a Giovanni. Lettura origeniana, 2006
- Omelie su Giosuè. Lettura origeniana, 2007
- Lampada ai miei passi. Leggere la Parola come i nostri Padri, 2007
- Cristo e Asclepio. Culti terapeutici e taumaturgici nel mondo mediterraneo antico fra cristiani e pagani, (cur.) 2008
- Il "Vangelo secondo Paolo". Qualche esempio di lectio divina per l'anno paolino, 2008
- Storia della mariologia, 1. Dal modello biblico al modello letterario, (cur.) 2009
- Santi nella famiglia salesiana, 2009
- Le parabole del regno nel commento a Matteo. Lettura origeniana, 2009
- L'opera di Luca. L'"oggi" di Dio e l'"oggi" dell'uomo si incontrano nella fede, nella speranza e nella carità operosa dei credenti, 2009
- In ascolto dell'altro. Esercizi spirituali con Benedetto XVI, Libreria Editrice Vaticana, 2010
- Il Vangelo e i Padri. Per un'esegesi teologica, Rogate, 2010
- Omelie sul Vangelo di Luca. Lettura origeniana, (cur.) 2010
- Cristo nostra salvezza. Il mistero pasquale nella Bibbia e nei Padri, con Raniero Cantalamessa, Lateran University Press, 2011
- Il grido di Giobbe, 2011
- "Chi è Gesù Cristo?". La questione di Dio nel Vangelo di Marco, 2011
- "L'educazione è cosa di cuore". La responsabilità degli educatori oggi, Lateran University Press, 2012
- Il Padre lo vide da lontano... L'opera di Luca: l'"oggi" dell'uomo e l'"oggi" di Dio si incontrano nella fede della Chiesa, 2012
- Comunicare la fede. Per una nuova evangelizzazione, Lateran University Press, 2012
- Forme di vita spirituale nei Padri della Chiesa, Lateran University Press, 2012
- "Si alzò e lo seguì" (Mt. 9,9). Camminare, costruire, edificare con la cultura nelle periferie esistenziali della città. Il Vangelo secondo Matteo, 2013
- Ascolta, scende la sera, Lateran University Press, 2014
- "Voi stessi date a loro da mangiare...", Lateran University Press, 2014
- L'università al traguardo, Lateran University Press, 2015
- Filosofia e teologia tra il IV e V secolo. Contesto, figure e momenti di una sintesi epocale, Lateran University Press, 2016
- Dante, Celestino, Bonifacio. L'indulgenza del Giubileo è ancora di moda?, LBE - La Bonifaciana Edizioni, 2019
- Cristo o Asclepio? I primi cristiani e la medicina, LBE - La Bonifaciana Edizioni, 2020

Catholic Church titles
Preceded by Salvatore Fisichella	Rector of the Pontifical Lateran University; 30 June 2010 – 2 June 2018	Succeeded by Vincenzo Buonomo
