= Església de Sant Julià i Sant Germà =

Church in Sant Julià de Lòria, Andorra

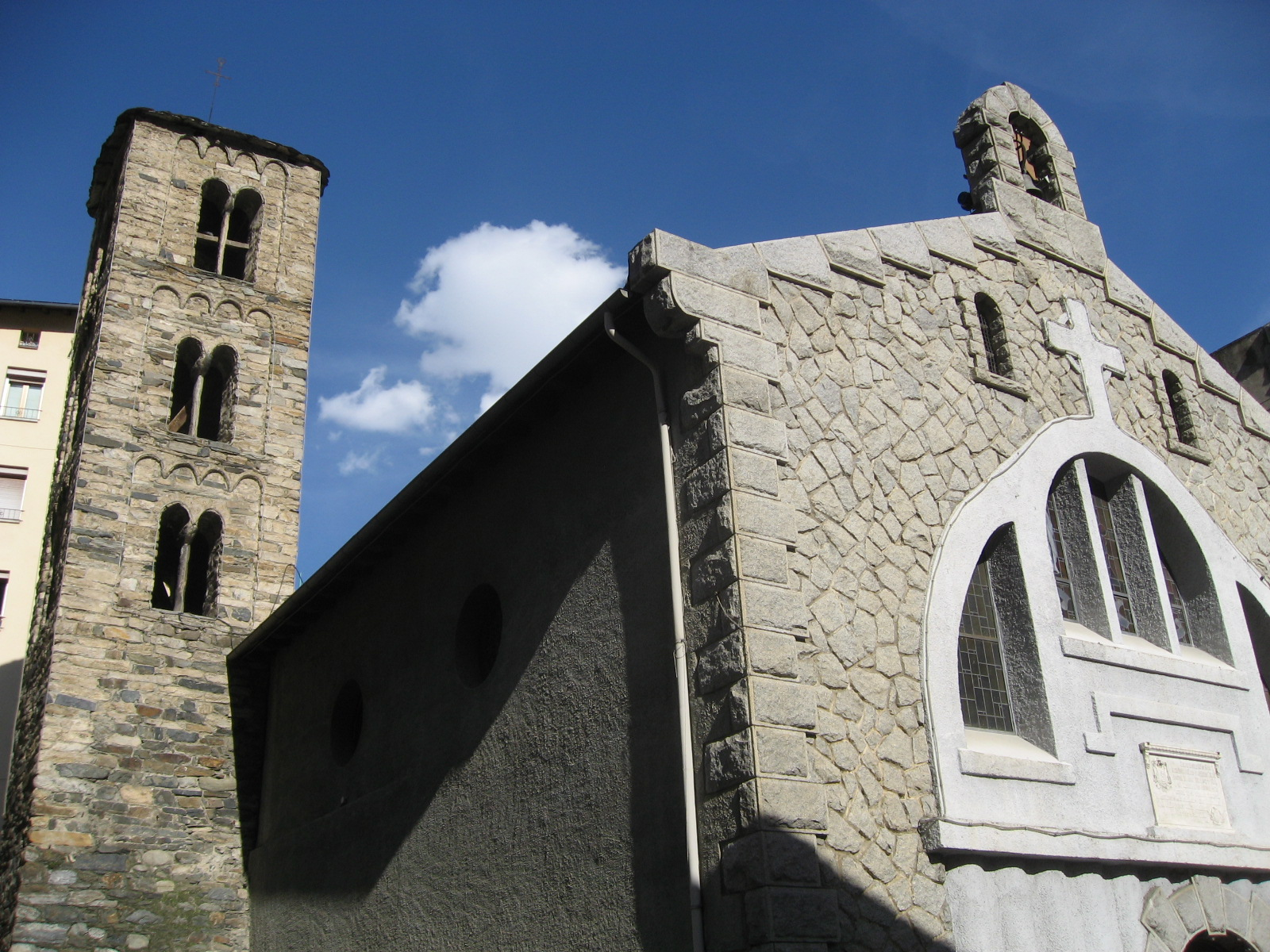
- Església de Sant Julià i Sant Germà
- 42°27′50″N 1°29′27″E
- Location: Sant Julià de Lòria, Andorra
- Country: Andorra
- Denomination: Catholic Church
- Sui iuris church: Latin Church

Església de Sant Julià i Sant Germà is a church located in Sant Julià de Lòria, Andorra. Originally built using Romanesque architecture, renovations from the 17–20th centuries have added Baroque architecture. The Cultural Heritage of Andorra registered the church as an asset of cultural interest on 16 July 2003.

== History ==
First mentioned in the 9th century, Església de Sant Julià i Sant Germà is located in Sant Julià de Lòria, Andorra, and is dedicated to Julia of Corsica and Germanus of Auxerre. The Cultural Heritage of Andorra listed the church as an asset of cultural interest on 16 July 2003.

== Structure ==
Originally constructed using Romanesque architecture, renovations have added Baroque architecture to the church. The building is three stories tall and a frieze of blind arches is at the top. The bell tower on the north side of the church was constructed in the style of Lombard architecture in the 11th century and has been preserved.

The nave was modified in the 17–18th centuries and was demolished and entirely replaced in 1939–1940. The façade was replaced in the 20th century. Modifications were made to the church occurred in 1974, in order to enlarge the nave and remove the cemetery. The apse was enlarged in the 17th century. A €600,000 renovation project, which decorated the apse with stain glass, were completed in 2019.

Antoni Tramulles designed the main altarpiece in 1622. There are two Baroque altarpieces in the church.

== Art ==
There is a 71 cm tall polychrome wood carving of Virgin of Los Remedios in the church. It has been poorly preserved and been repainted multiple times. A mosaic created by Marko Rupnik was added to the church in 2019.

== Works cited ==
=== News ===
- Noya, Brown (23 May 2019). "Sant Julià i Sant Germà passa d'església a monument en una obra colossal". Altaveu. Archived from the original on 30 April 2025.

=== Web ===
- "Església de Sant Julià i Sant Germà de Lòria". Cultural Heritage of Andorra. Archived from the original on 9 May 2012.
- "Sant Julià i Sant Germà". Museus. Archived from the original on 30 April 2025.
- "Sant Julià i Sant Germà (Sant Julià de Lòria)". Gran Enciclopèdia Catalana. Archived from the original on 30 April 2025.
