= Pontifical committee =

Pontifical committee may refer to the following bodies in the Roman Curia:

- Pontifical Committee for International Eucharistic Congresses, established in 1879
- Pontifical Committee for Historical Sciences, established in 1954
