= Ecclesiastical prison =

Prisons maintained by the Catholic Church

Ecclesiastical prisons were penal institutions maintained by the Catholic Church. At various times, they were used for the incarceration both of clergy accused of various crimes, and of laity accused of specifically ecclesiastical crimes; prisoners were sometimes held in custody while awaiting trial, sometimes as part of an imposed sentence. The use of ecclesiastical prisons began as early as the third or fourth century AD, and remained common through the early modern era.

== Monastic prisons ==
Some of the earliest uses of imprisonment as a penalty in itself, rather than as a practical means of detaining accused criminals, took place in the context of Christian monastic communities. The rules of many religious orders, including the early rule of St. Pachomius (c. 300 AD), the rule of St. Fructuosus, the Dominican Constitutions, the rule of Fontevraud Abbey, and the rules of the Mercedarians, Trinitarians, Augustinians, Norbertines, Carthusians, Carmelites, and Cistercians, prescribed imprisonment as a penalty for various forms of misbehavior among the monks. In the late fourth century, Pope Siricius instructed monasteries to use penal imprisonment in his Directa Decretal, an instruction renewed in 895 at the Council of Tribur and again in 1140 in the Decretum Gratiani. These monastic prisons were referred to with various Latin terms, including murus ("wall"), cella obscura ("hidden cell"), ergastulum ("workhouse"), and carcer ("prison").

Penal imprisonment was also practiced in similar forms among female religious orders. One notable such case was the Nun of Watton, a twelfth-century figure confined in an ecclesiastical prison after her pregnancy was discovered.

The use of monastic prisons was not restricted to the monks themselves. Nonmonastic clergy and laymen could be sentenced to detrusio in monasterium (confinement in a monastery), which could consist either of simply living in a monastery or of being incarcerated in a monastic prison. Secular European rulers of the fifth through eleventh centuries, who generally lacked facilities of their own for keeping prisoners, also made use of monastic prisons. These secular prisoners in monastic prisons were sometimes criminals, but often they were simply political adversaries, such as in the cases of Childeric III (imprisoned by Pepin the Short); Pepin the Hunchback and Tassilo III (imprisoned by Charlemagne); and various political opponents of Louis the Pious and of Henry II. Ecclesiastical reforms in the late eleventh century largely suppressed the practice of confining political opponents to monasteries, but secular authorities continued to make use of monastic prisons; in the case of female prisoners, confining them to a convent rather than a secular prison could be a means of avoiding rape.

Early monastic imprisonment often simply involved confining the offending monk to his cell, or to some other room temporarily designated as a prison; with the growing use of incarceration as a punishment, however, monasteries increasingly built dedicated prison facilities. These were usually purpose-built cells, but in some cases might be free-standing prisons; one of the earliest examples of the latter was built at the Mount Sinai Monastery before the seventh century AD. Some orders, such as the Cistercians and Benedictines, explicitly required that each monastery contain prison cells.

Incarceration in monastic prisons was sometimes for periods as short as a day; other sentences lasted indefinitely, or for life. Monastic prisons, unlike secular prisons, typically involved solitary confinement, sometimes mitigated by visits from superiors. Inmates in monastic prisons were sometimes kept in chains, and their sentences often included deprivation of food, corporal punishment, various forms of ritual humiliation, or ecclesiastical penalties such as excommunication.

Some medieval monasteries practiced permanent immurement in prisons called Vade in pace ("go in peace"), so named because inmates were expected to remain in them until death. Peter the Venerable, writing in the early twelfth century, attributed the first Vade in pace to a prior named Matthew of Saint-Martin-des-Champs. The practice spread, being attested in locations including St Albans Abbey, Toulouse, Lespinasse, Lodi, and San Salvatore. John II of France intervened, at the request of the Archbishop of Toulouse, to require the monasteries to allow imprisoned monks weekly visitors.

Jesuits were notable among religious orders for not using imprisonment as a disciplinary tool. The order's founder, Ignatius of Loyola, had himself spent time incarcerated in a monastic prison in Salamanca while being interrogated about his theological teachings. An anecdote tells of Ignatius, asked why the charter of his order did not call for the use of incarceration, answering that it was unnecessary when expulsion from the Society was always available.

== Diocesan prisons ==
The use of incarceration as an ecclesiastical penalty dates back well before the beginning of the second millennium, with examples attested in the 438 Codex Theodosianus, the canons of the 581 Synod of Mâcon, the 8th-century Gelasian Sacramentary, and the writings of the 8th-century bishop Ecgbert of York. It was not, however, until the eleventh, twelfth, and thirteenth centuries that ecclesiastical prisons began to grow increasingly common. As part of the codification of canon law in the thirteenth century, Pope Boniface VIII issued his 1298 Liber Sextus, which endorsed the use of imprisonment as a legal penalty. At this point, the already-common practice of ecclesiastical prisons was becoming near-universal, with each bishopric expected to maintain its own prison; for example, Notre Dame built its prison in 1285, and Boniface, the Archbishop of Canterbury, made the practice mandatory in his jurisdiction in 1261.

Although the practice of keeping ecclesiastical prisons in each diocese was becoming increasingly standard, the specifics of the prisons themselves and their keeping were largely left up to local authorities. The severity of the penalties imposed varied widely: in some cases a brief period of incarceration might serve as a penalty for a cleric lying under oath, while other prisons kept chains, bolts, and gags expressly in order to "terrorize and cause fear" in their young female captives.

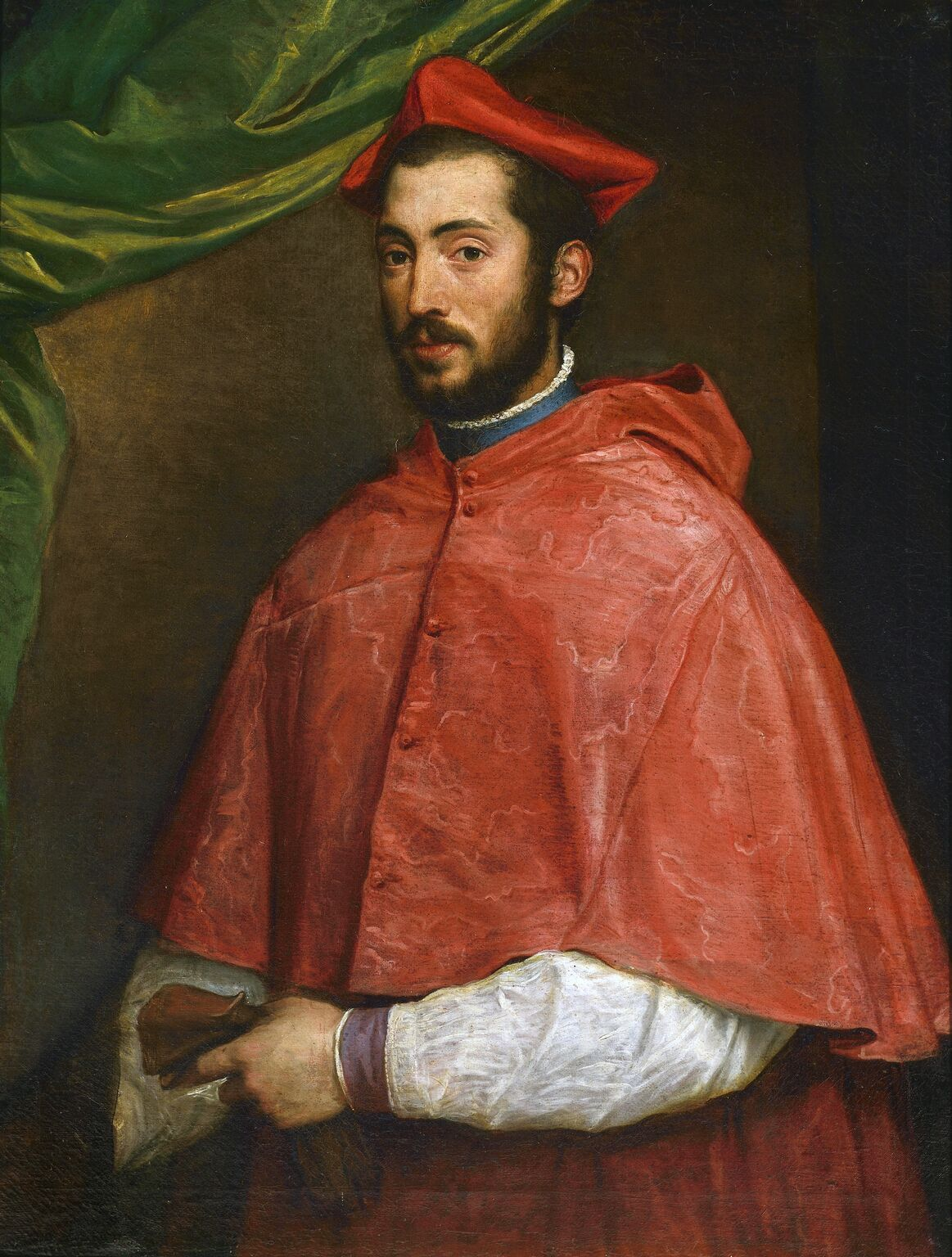
Alessandro Farnese, later Pope Paul III, at one time an inmate of the papal prison of Castel Sant'Angelo

In the Papal States, where the civic power of the Catholic Church was uniquely strong, ecclesiastical prisons saw heavy use. The Castel Sant'Angelo in Rome served as a papal prison from 1367 to 1870 while under the control of the Papal States. Notable figures confined there included:

- Alessandro Farnese, prior to becoming Pope Paul III (late 15th or early 16th century)
- Benvenuto Cellini, author and artisan (1539–1540)
- Giordano Bruno, philosopher and cosmologist (periods 1592–1600)
- Marco Antonio de Dominis, bishop and reformer (1624)
- Lorenzo Ricci, Superior General of the Society of Jesus (1773–1775)
- Alessandro Cagliostro, magician (c. 1789–1795)

Another notable ecclesiastical prison in the Papal States was San Michele a Ripa, a juvenile detention facility built in 1703 by Pope Clement XI. Young offenders could be sentenced to San Michele by the courts, and parents or guardians could voluntarily send recalcitrant boys to the prison. Although the young inmates often endured conditions such as corporal punishment and being chained to their desks, San Michele was considered by contemporaries to be a model of an enlightened penal system.

== Inquisitorial prisons ==
With the twelfth-century founding of the Inquisition, and its eponymous process of inquisitio (inquest), came an increasing need for ecclesiastical prisons to hold suspects during a potentially lengthy investigation. Instead of being incarcerated merely for a brief period of time between arrest and trial, the captives of the Inquisition were routinely held until they confessed to the satisfaction of their interrogators and implicated others; in some cases this process took years, sometimes spent in solitary confinement. Imprisonment served as an interrogation technique in itself, sometimes in place of torture; if simple imprisonment (and the expense of being required to pay for it) was insufficient to extract a confession, interrogators had the option of subjecting the prisoner to solitary confinement, inadequate food, physical restraints, or other harsh conditions. Canon law, as set down in the Decretium Gratiani and the Decretals of Gregory IX, also allowed the use of torture; in 1252, Pope Innocent IV specifically licensed the use of torture on Inquisition prisoners, and in 1256 Pope Alexander IV gave permission for inquisitors to absolve each other for violating the tradition against clerical shedding of blood by performing the torture themselves.

This increased incarceration quickly overwhelmed the existing ecclesiastical prisons. Inquisitors, being largely members of mendicant orders, generally had no prisons of their own to use. It became necessary to build new prisons especially for the Inquisition, funded partly by local lords, partly by property seized from convicted heretics. These prisons were often rather loosely run, with most prisoners kept under conditions called murus largus, which allowed them to wander freely within the prison and socialize with their fellow prisoners of both sexes; no organized program of work or prayer was imposed, and outside visitors were often unrestricted. Prisoners under a higher degree of suspicion were instead kept in murus strictus, which meant solitary confinement; when combined with shackles and a diet of bread and water, this was called strictissimus carceris ("strictest imprisonment"). Conversely, those under only minor suspicion were often allowed out on probation, allowed to return home on condition of reporting in on a daily basis.

The prison sentences imposed by the Inquisition varied by time, place, the judgement of the inquisitor, and how convincingly a given heretic recanted; some sentences were as short as one year, but most were for life, a sentence which included confiscation of the convict's property. However, some prisoners sentenced to life imprisonment who demonstrated repentance and cooperation with their captors could hope to be freed on parole, and others took advantage of the loosely managed prison system to simply escape.

In the 13th century, the conditions in some inquisitorial prisons, especially those of southern France, were considered inhumane even by contemporaries (although wealthy prisoners were sometimes able to escape the worst of the treatment). The consuls of Carcassonne wrote of the local prison:

We feel ourselves aggrieved in that you, contrary to the use and custom observed by your predecessors in the Inquisition, have made a new prison, called the mur. Truly this could be called with good cause a hell. For in it you have constructed little cells for the purpose of tormenting and torturing people. Some of these cells are dark and airless, so that those lodged there cannot tell if it is day or night, and they are continuously deprived of air and light. In other cells there are kept miserable wretches laden with shackles, some of wood, some of iron. These cannot move, but defecate and urinate on themselves. Nor can they lie down except on the frigid ground. They have endured torments like these day and night for a long time. In other miserable places in the prison, not only is there no light or air, but food is rarely distributed, and that only bread and water.

Many prisoners have been put in similar situations, in which several, because of the severity of their tortures, have lost limbs and have been completely incapacitated. Many, because of the unbearable conditions and their great suffering, have died a most cruel death. In these prisons there is constantly heard an immense wailing, weeping, groaning, and gnashing of teeth. What more can one say? For these prisoners life is a torment and death a comfort. And thus coerced they say that what is false is true, choosing to die once rather than to endure more torture. As a result of these false and coerced confessions not only do those making the confessions perish, but so do the innocent people named by them.

— J. M. Vidal, Un Inquisiteur jugé

After a 1296 uprising in Carcassonne over the conditions of the inquisitorial prison, King Philip IV of France began to fear more such uprisings throughout Languedoc. In 1306, Pope Clement V sent a delegation of cardinals to investigate the conditions in the inquisitorial prisons of southern France. The delegation reported haphazard management, buildings in disrepair, and shocking conditions, and ordered immediate reforms. These reforms, once implemented, left inquisitorial prisons among the best-run in Europe, according to historian Edward M. Peters; prisoners convicted on other charges were known to confess to heresy in order to be sent there.

== Modern era ==
Ecclesiastical prisons remained commonplace through the early modern era. Jean Mabillon, a French monk and scholar, criticized them in his "Reflections on the Prisons of the Monastic Orders", c. 1690, after seeing a young friend sentenced to fifteen years in the prison at Mont-Saint-Michel Abbey suffer severe physical consequences from his treatment there. Mont-Saint-Michel continued in use as an ecclesiastical prison until 1791, when, during the French Revolution the abbey was closed and converted entirely into a prison; it was not until 1863 that the prison was closed altogether, so that the building could be restored and, in 1874, declared a monument historique.

During the early modern era, ecclesiastical prisons in many places gradually fell out of use or became secularized.John Howard, an early prison reformer, visited Lisbon's Cadeia do Aljube in 1783; it would become a civil prison in 1808. In the Isle of Man, ecclesiastical prisons were in active use up through the early 19th century, with records of one William Faragher being imprisoned in 1812 for refusing to pay a tithe.

Article 16 of the Concordat of 1953 between Pope Pius XII and Francisco Franco established a separate ecclesiastical prison system in Spain, where clergy convicted under secular law would serve their sentences in monasteries or other dedicated institutions. In 1976, revisions to the Concordat removed Article 16.

== See also ==
- Ecclesiastical court
- Ecclesiastical crime
- Ecclesiastical ordinance
