= Officiality =

Roman Catholic Church ecclesiastical court

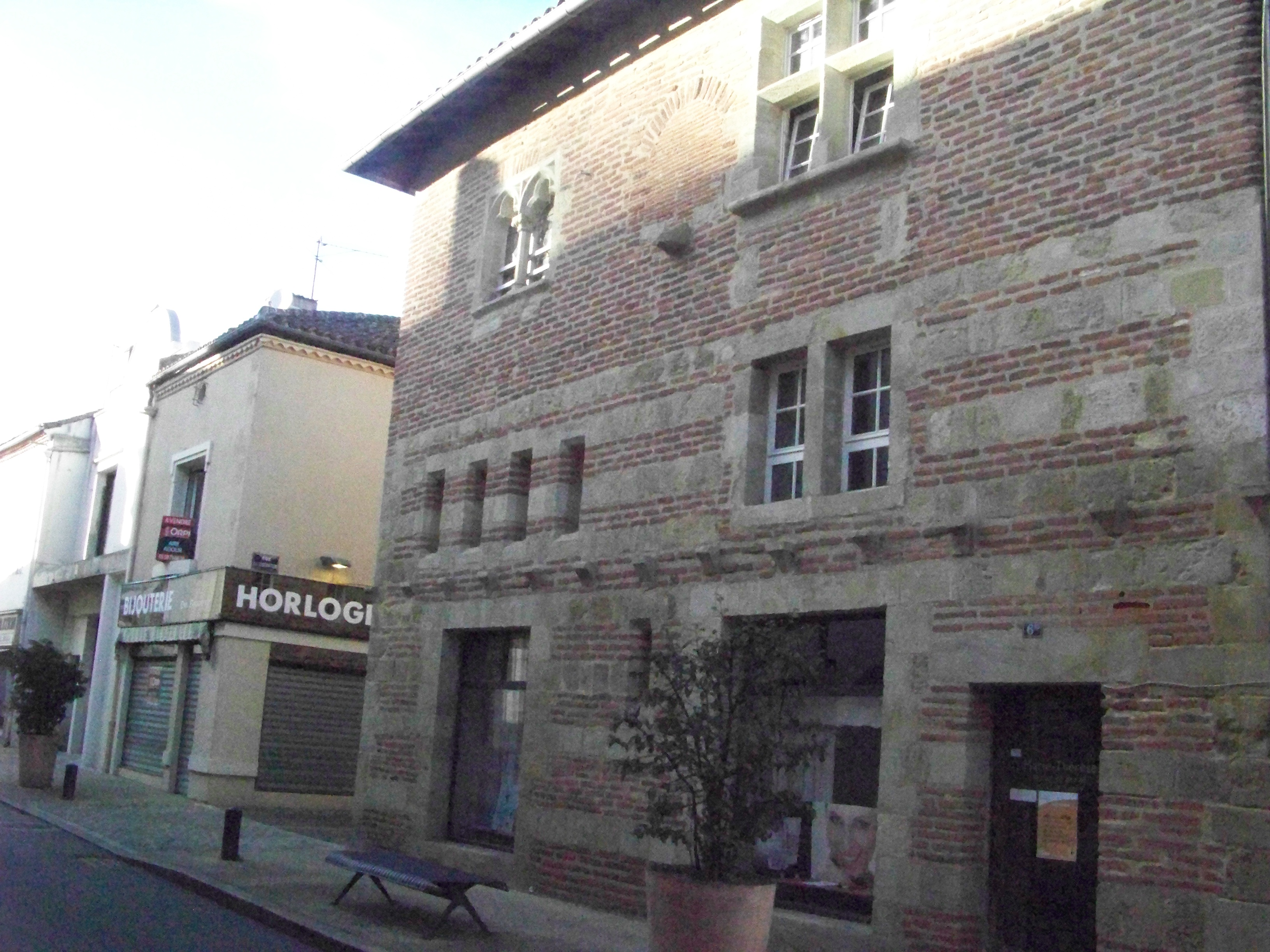
Former officiality house of the Diocese of Aire.

The officiality is the ecclesiastical court responsible for administering justice in the name of the person who exercises judicial authority in the Catholic Church.

Under the Latin forms officialatus in the 13th century and officialitas in the 14th century, the term officiality originally designated the office of the judicial vicar. It subsequently also came to designate the court presided over by the vicar.

The word "officiality" is more a customary term than a technical one. The Code of Canon Law of 1983 uses the term tribunal.

== Governance in the Catholic Church ==
The Church is a society endowed with all the powers required to achieve its proper end. The power of governance within it follows very specific principles that stem from the way the Church understands itself, in light of its founding principles, which it does not control, as they are derived from Christ.

This power of governance is not divided within the Church. A single person may exercise legislative power (enacting ecclesiastical laws), executive power (issuing decrees of various kinds or granting dispensations), and judicial power (judging by particular decree or by judicial decision). This is the case, for the universal Church, of the Roman Pontiff and the College of Bishops, and for each particular Church, of its own bishop. The diocesan bishop personally exercises legislative power. He exercises executive power personally or through his vicars general and episcopal vicars, and judicial power through his judicial vicar (the official).

== Judicial power in the Catholic Church ==
=== Spiritual matters ===
The Church has always exercised judicial power in spiritual matters. Its right to adjudicate causes of a religious nature was so evident that, once the era of persecutions had passed, the Roman emperors expressly recognized it.

=== Temporal matters ===
==== Temporal causes involving the laity ====
The Council of Agde (506), the Second Council of Orléans (549), and the Third Council of Paris (557) recommended that clerics defend freed persons before public courts, while the Second Council of Mâcon (585) and the Council of Paris (614) granted bishops exclusive jurisdiction over their cases. Pope Gelasius I requested that the causes of widows and orphans be taken up. Crusaders fell under ecclesiastical jurisdiction, as did students (scholares). Bishops could also judge matters of testamentary law insofar as they concerned "pious bequests"; in criminal matters, they were competent to hear cases involving adultery, abduction, and usury.

The concessions of the Roman emperors explain the expansion of ecclesiastical jurisdictions, notably those of Constantine, who first allowed the faithful to resort to episcopal arbitration by granting civil force to episcopal sentences (321 or 318), and who later granted bishops, in civil matters, jurisdiction concurrent with that of civil judges (331 or 333).

Subsequently, the privileges of immunity granted by Merovingian kings and confirmed by the Carolingians to a large number of bishops and abbots, together with the fact that these ecclesiastics were often feudal lords with judicial authority over their lands, contributed to the development of Church courts.

Moreover, the faithful were more inclined to bring their disputes before these courts than before secular tribunals: procedures were written and based on investigations, costs were relatively low compared with feudal jurisdictions, the appeals system allowed direct recourse to the pope, and the law did not vary according to local customs.

==== Temporal causes involving clerics ====
The privilege of forum was recognized for bishops, in criminal matters, by the emperor Constantius II in 355. It was abolished in 452 by Valentinian III, who thereafter recognized criminal jurisdiction only in spiritual matters. The Church, however, endeavored to preserve it.

== Creation and functioning of officialities in the Middle Ages ==
The judicial power of the Church was originally exercised by the bishop, who judged criminal clerics and causes brought before him by laypersons in synods or in assemblies convened for the settlement of disputes. From the 12th century, the increasing number of cases brought before ecclesiastical jurisdiction, the growing complexity of procedure with the development of canon law and inquisitorial procedure, and the increasing burdens placed on bishops—particularly in the service of princes or the pope—led prelates to delegate their judicial power to a professional and permanent judge, who quickly came to be known as the official. In France, the earliest known officials served as judges for the Archbishop of Reims in the last quarter of the 12th century.

The official acts judicially in place of the bishop: the judgments he renders may not be appealed to the bishop who appointed him. He may impose and lift ecclesiastical censures. He is salaried by the bishop, who may revoke him. His mandate ends upon the death of the bishop. In most dioceses, the bishop appoints only one official. The Diocese of Reims is an exception, having two officials with exactly the same jurisdiction, whether they act jointly or separately.

From the 13th century, the official's court gradually became institutionalized with permanent personnel. In addition to the official who presided, this court included promoters who investigated cases, notaries, procurators, and a sealer responsible for affixing seals to acts produced by the court.

Ecclesiastical institutions possessing jurisdiction established officialities: there were archidiaconal officialities in particular, but also capitular and monastic officialities. Above episcopal jurisdiction were metropolitan and primatial officialities. Appeals were made from one level to the immediately superior one.

The competence of officialities, very broad in the Middle Ages, tended to diminish over the course of the early modern period. By the 18th century, it essentially concerned ecclesiastical discipline and matrimonial causes.

In principle, officials imposed penalties that were all penitential in nature. Monetary fines, very common in France from at least the 15th century but exceptional in England, were required to be strictly directed toward pious and charitable purposes. Imprisonment was used by ecclesiastical courts earlier than by secular tribunals because of its penitential dimension: it aimed above all to induce the offender to seek divine forgiveness. Officialities also imposed penalties of humiliation, graded sanctions, public penance, and made use of judicial pilgrimage.

The jurisdiction of officialities was progressively challenged by royal courts. The possibility of appealing a judgment of an ecclesiastical court to the Parlement became established in the second half of the 15th century and, at the beginning of the 16th century, took the name "appeal as from abuse".

== Objects of judicial power ==
- Cases concerning spiritual matters and those connected with them:
  - either formally, in their very essence: faith, grace;
  - or because they are causes of salvation for souls: the sacraments, sacramentals, preaching, prayers, etc.;
  - or because they are an effect or use of a spiritual power: blessings, dispensations, offices, benefices, and all acts of ecclesiastical jurisdiction;
  - or temporal matters which by their nature are united to spiritual matters: the legal personality of ecclesiastical public juridic persons or sacred places;
- violations of ecclesiastical laws;
- formerly: all causes, whether contentious or criminal, relating to persons who enjoyed the privilege of forum;
- formerly: certain causes, known as mixed forum causes, in which civil and ecclesiastical authority were equally competent. This was the case, for example, with causes concerning patronage rights, oaths, polygamy, witchcraft, or incest.

Today, diocesan tribunals most often judge matrimonial causes. However, all causes may be introduced before an ecclesiastical tribunal within the framework of the general law of the Catholic Church.

Tribunals therefore sometimes hear disputes between two religious congregations, or between a lay person and a congregation or a diocese. More rarely, disputes arise between two lay persons who do not wish to bring their case before a civil court. In such situations, the tribunal may recognize its own jurisdiction, while lacking any power of coercion other than moral for the enforcement of its judgment. In the recent past, some judgments of ecclesiastical tribunals have been regarded by civil courts, with the agreement of the parties, as a form of conciliation.

Following the Synod of Bishops of October 2014, which noted the difficulty faced by the faithful in accessing ecclesiastical tribunals in order to obtain a new valid sacramental marriage through the declaration of nullity of a defective religious marriage, Pope Francis promulgated on 15 August 2015 the motu proprio Mitis Iudex Dominus Iesus ("The Lord Jesus, the merciful judge"), which lightened the canonical procedure for declaring matrimonial nullity. This motu proprio is paired with Mitis et misericors Iesus ("Jesus, gentle and merciful"), which concerns more specifically the Eastern Catholic Churches.

== Subjects of the judicial power of the Catholic Church ==
Under the former canon law, only the baptized were subjects of the Church's judicial power.

Since the Code of Canon Law of 1983, "any person, baptized or not, can act in a trial; and the party legitimately summoned must respond". Any person may therefore bring an action before ecclesiastical tribunals, for example in proceedings for declaration of nullity of marriage. Minors and those deprived of the use of reason may litigate only through their parents, guardians, or curators. Juridic persons act in court through their legitimate representatives.

== Judicial organization of the contemporary Catholic Church ==
=== Provocatio ad Romanum Pontificem ===
Any member of the faithful may appeal directly to the pope for judgment of a case, either as plaintiff or defendant, at any degree of jurisdiction and at any stage of the process, in contentious or penal matters.

=== Court of first instance ===
The judge of first instance is the diocesan bishop. The judicial vicar (also called the official) possesses ordinary power to judge and constitutes with the bishop one single tribunal. For practical reasons, several diocesan bishops may establish a common (interdiocesan) tribunal.

The official is a Catholic priest, doctor or licentiate in canon law. For certain proceedings requiring a collegiate formation, the bishop appoints diocesan judges. In collegiate tribunals, the presiding judge designates one member as rapporteur (or ponent), who presents the case and drafts the judgment.

==== Public prosecutor ====
The promoter of justice is charged with defending the public good in penal causes. In contentious causes, it belongs to the bishop to judge whether the public good may be involved, unless intervention of the promoter of justice is prescribed by law or required by the nature of the case.

The Defender of the bond intervenes in cases of nullity or dissolution of marriage and in cases of nullity of ordination.

==== Registry ====
The notary ensures the formal regularity of procedural acts. All acts are null if they are not signed by the notary, and all acts drawn up by the notary enjoy public faith.

==== Officers of the court ====
Judicial procurators represent the parties in all procedural acts. Each party may have only one procurator, who may not be replaced except with the express consent of the party represented.

Advocates, mandatory in penal causes, assist and defend the parties orally or in writing. Several may be appointed together. They must be Catholics.

=== Court of second instance ===
The court of second instance hears, at a hierarchically superior level, cases already decided by a court of first instance. The entire trial is reheard, from the facts to their legal resolution, to verify that the first judgment was just.

The court of second instance always judges collegially. As a rule, the court of second instance is that of the Metropolitan archbishop.

== See also ==
- Roman Rota
- Ecclesiastical court
- Apostolic Signatura

== Bibliography ==
- Fournier, Paul (1880). Les Officialités au Moyen Âge [Ecclesiastical Courts in the Middle Ages] (in French). Paris: E. Plon et Cie. pp. XXXV–329.
- Beaulande-Barraud, Véronique; Charageat, Martine, eds. (2014). Les officialités dans l'Europe médiévale et moderne : des tribunaux pour une société chrétienne [Ecclesiastical Courts in Medieval and Modern Europe: Tribunals for a Christian Society] (in French). Turnhout: Brepols. ISBN 978-2-503-55149-4.
