= Velehrad =

- Municipality
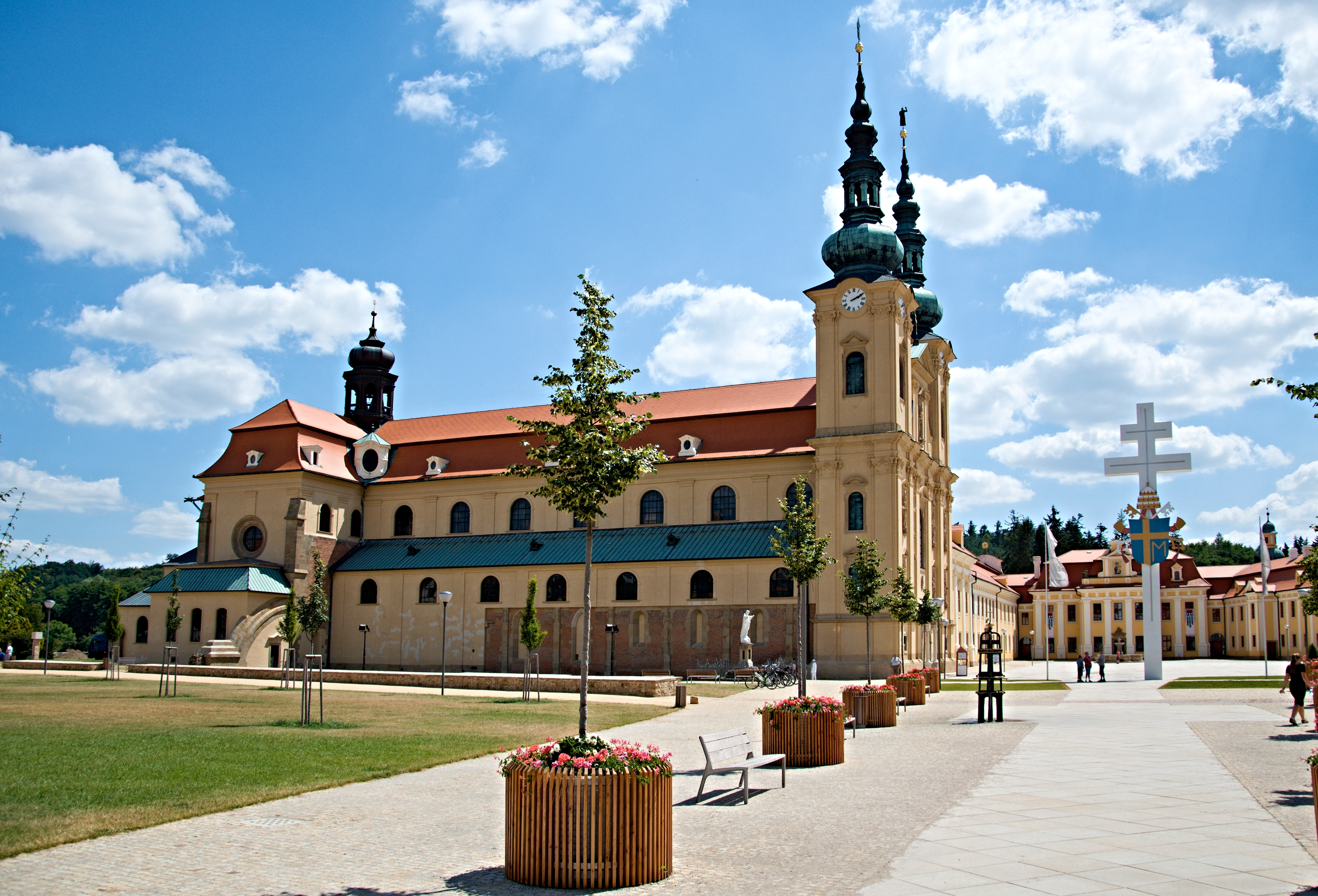
- Basilica of Saints Cyril and Methodius

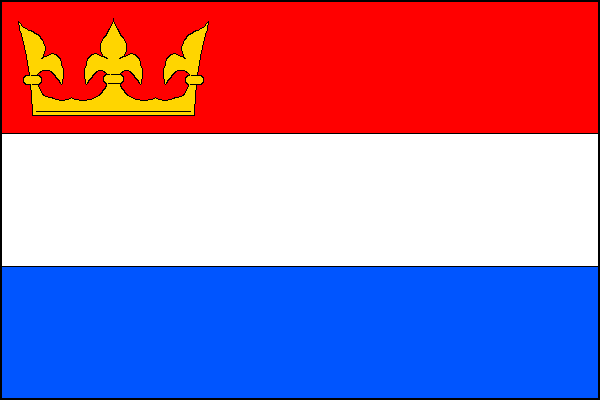
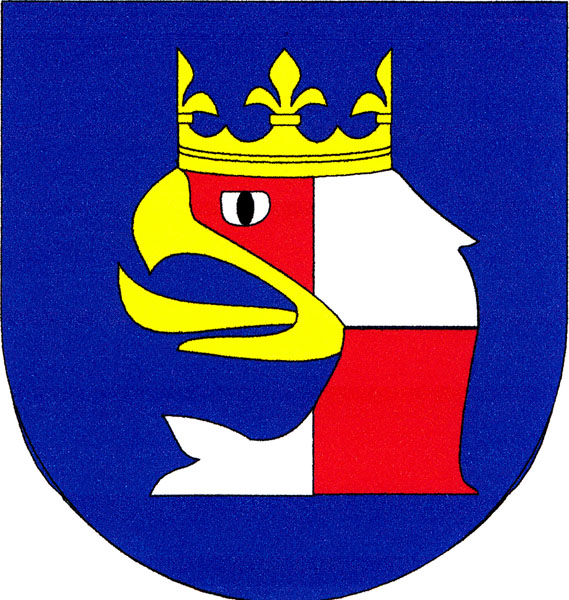
- Flag Coat of arms

- Location in the Czech Republic
- Coordinates: 49°6′20″N 17°23′39″E
- Country: Czech Republic
- Region: Zlín
- District: Uherské Hradiště
- Founded: 1205

Area
  - Total: 22.25 km^{2} (8.59 sq mi)
- Elevation: 219 m (719 ft)

Population (2026-01-01)
  - Total: 1,119
  - Density: 50.29/km^{2} (130.3/sq mi)
- Time zone: UTC+1 (CET)
  - Summer (DST): UTC+2 (CEST)
- Postal code: 687 06
- Website: www.velehrad.cz

Velehrad (Czech pronunciation: [ˈvɛlɛɦrat]) is a municipality and village in Uherské Hradiště District in the Zlín Region of the Czech Republic. It has about 1,100 inhabitants. The village proper is located on the Salaška Stream in the Chřiby highlands.

Velehrad is known for its former Cistercian monastery with the Basilica of the Assumption of Mary and Saints Cyril and Methodius, which is the most famous Christian pilgrimage site in the country. It is protected as a national cultural monument.

== Geography ==
Velehrad is located about 6 kilometres (4 mi) northwest of Uherské Hradiště and 23 km (14 mi) southwest of Zlín. It lies mostly in the Chřiby highlands, only the southernmost part of the municipal territory extends into the Kyjov Hills. The highest point is the hill Kamenný kopec at 495 m (1,624 ft) above sea level. The built-up area lies in the valley of the Salaška Stream.

== History ==
The first written mention of Velingrad is from 1141. It was however the old name of neighbouring Staré Město, from which the name Velehrad was derived. In 1205, Moravian margrave Vladislaus III founded here a Cistercian monastery. The Romanesque monastery complex was finished in the first half of the 13th century.

After the monastery was abolished in 1784 by a decree of Emperor Joseph II, the people who worked in the monastery founded a municipality. The dilapidated monastery complex was gradually repaired in the mid-19th century. Since 1890, it has been managed by the Jesuits. It became an important pilgrimage site with the annual participation of tens of thousands of pilgrims. In the 1990s, it was visited twice by Pope John Paul II.

== Demographics ==
Historical population

Year	Pop.	±%
1869	544	—
1880	585	+7.5%
1890	594	+1.5%
1900	610	+2.7%
1910	686	+12.5%

Year	Pop.	±%
1921	798	+16.3%
1930	936	+17.3%
1950	1,196	+27.8%
1961	1,565	+30.9%
1970	1,503	−4.0%

Year	Pop.	±%
1980	1,535	+2.1%
1991	1,623	+5.7%
2001	1,471	−9.4%
2011	1,276	−13.3%
2021	1,099	−13.9%

Source: Censuses

== Transport ==
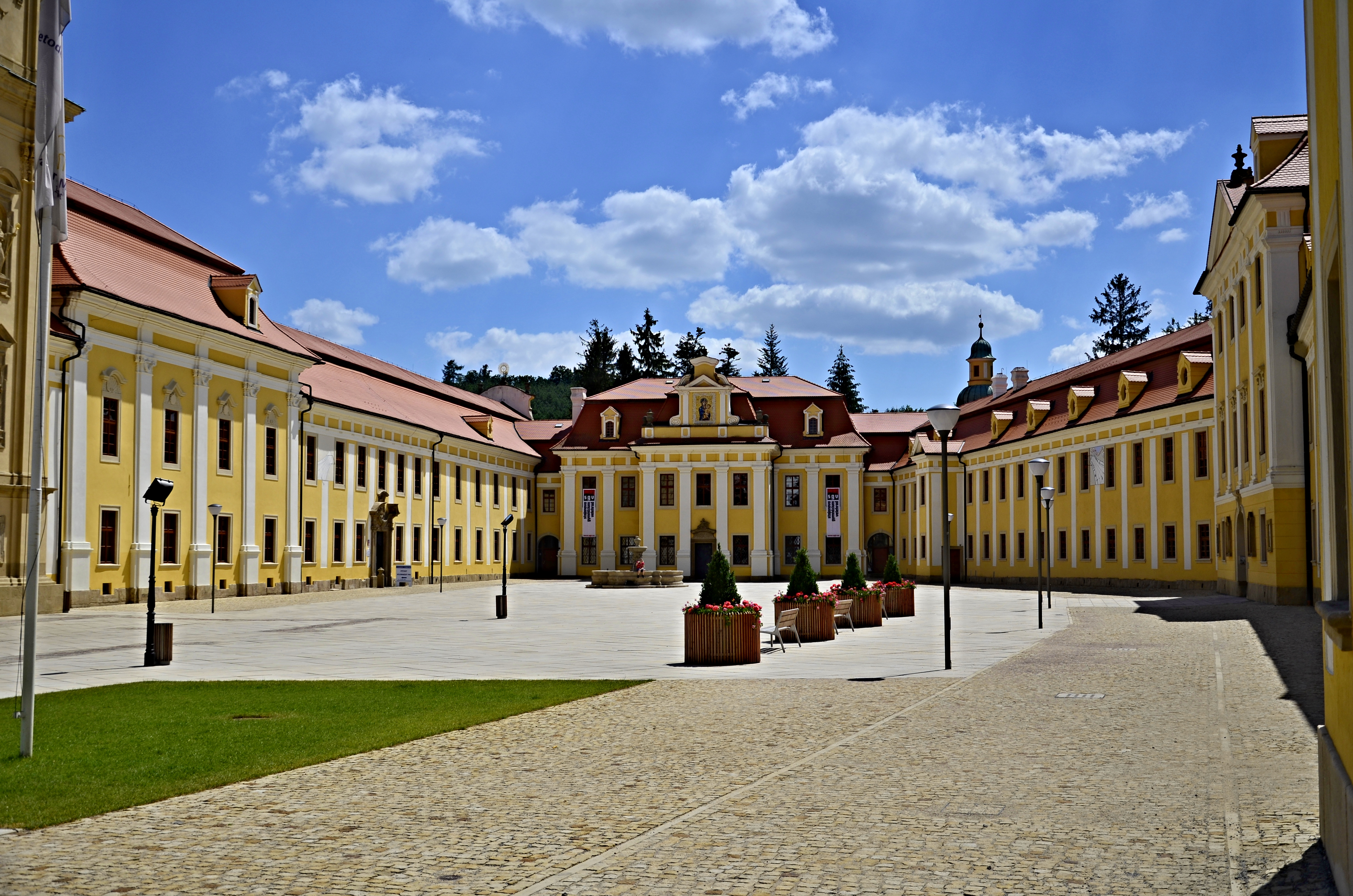
Cistercian monastery

There are no railways or major roads passing through the municipality.

== Sights ==
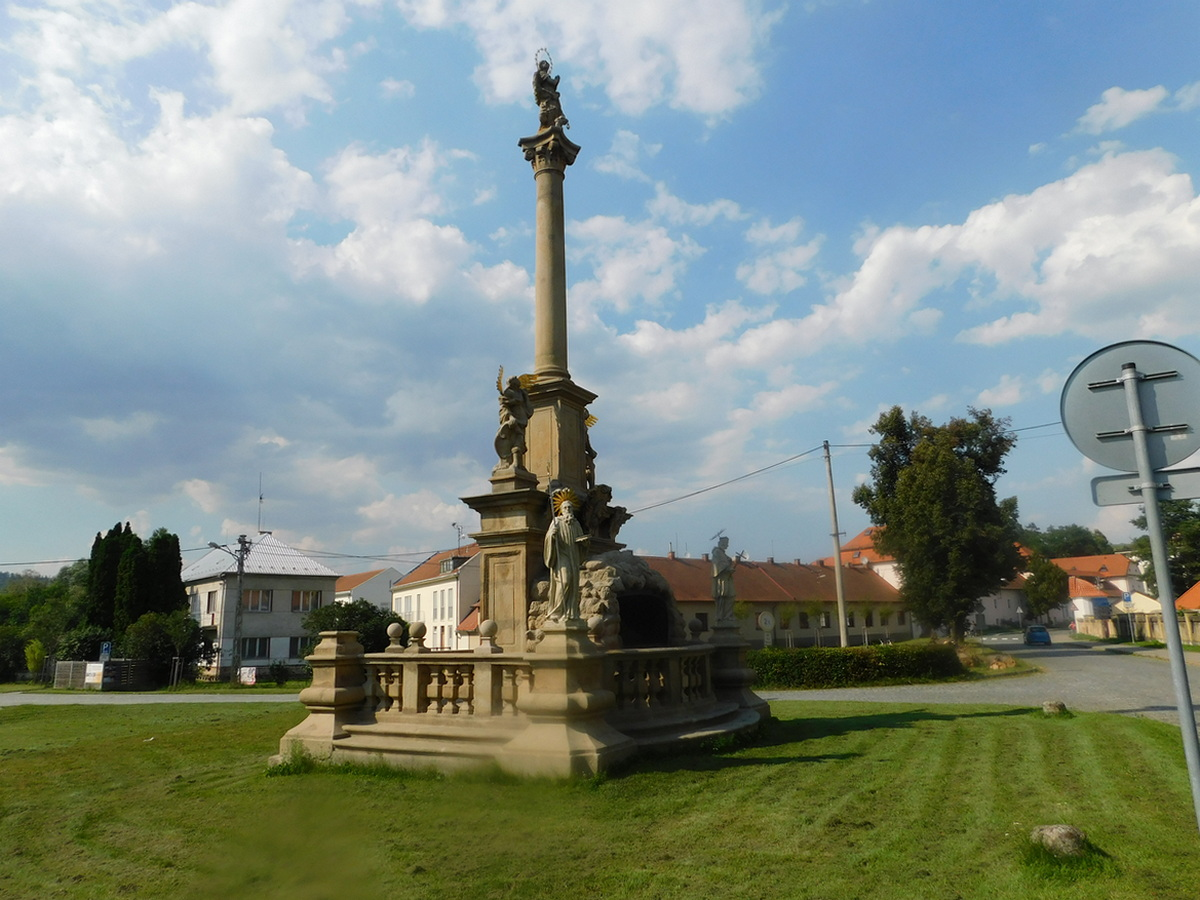
Marian column

The large complex of the former Cistercian monastery with the Basilica of the Assumption of Mary and Saints Cyril and Methodius is protected as a national cultural monument. It is the most famous pilgrimage site in the Czech Republic. The monastery complex from the 13th century was rebuilt in the Baroque style in the mid-18th century, but some parts of the original late Romanesque buildings have been preserved.

A notable landmark is the Marian column, located opposite the monastery. It is a Baroque column dating from 1676. In 1705, it was expanded by four statues of saints.

Other monuments and sights in Velehrad include the Velehrad house of Saints Cyril and Methodius (an information centre and a museum in the former farm buildings), the Velehrad cemetery (with many important personalities buried), Rosary Pilgrimage Route with the Stations of the Cross (connecting Velehrad with Staré Město) and many statues of saints and other small religious monuments.

== Notable people ==
- Franciszek Rychnowski (1850–1929), Polish engineer
- Otmar Oliva (born 1952), sculptor; lives and works here
