= Ecclesiastical crime =

An ecclesiastical crime is a crime (delict) committed against Catholic canon law vis-à-vis civil law.

== Examples ==
The crime of simony is the ecclesiastical crime of paying for offices or positions in the hierarchy of a church. The crimes of schism and heresy are also ecclesiastical crimes.

=== Financial and donation related ===
The term is also specifically used today for misappropriation of donation monies. In the International Bulletin of Missionary Research, January 2009, David B. Barrett, Todd M. Johnson, Peter F Crossing, in a study titled, "Christian World Communions: Five Overviews of Global Christianity, AD 1800–2025", show that "ecclesiastical crime" is growing at 5.77% per annum and in mid-2009 is estimated to be US$27 billion on a total "giving to Christian causes" of $410 Billion. Unchecked this crime will be valued at $65 Billion by 2025.

== See also ==
- Ecclesiastical courts
- Ecclesiastical ordinances
- Ecclesiastical prison
- Canon law
- Sacrament of Penance
