= Marek Holeček =

Czech mountain climber

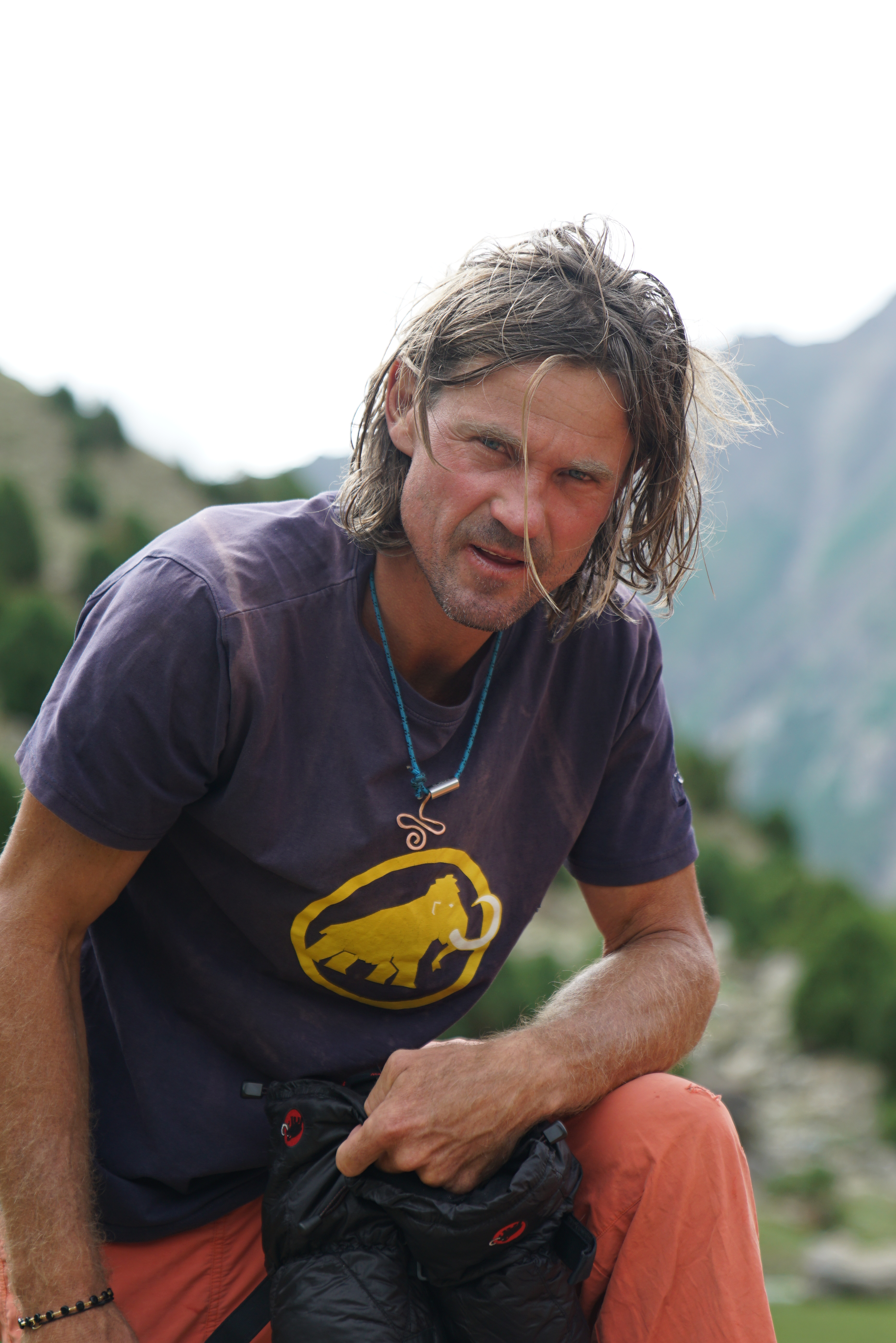
- Holeček in 2018

Personal information
- Nationality: Czech
- Born: 5 November 1974 (age 51) Prague, Czechoslovakia
- Website: marekholecek.cz

Climbing career
- First ascents: Peru Huandoy Norte; Nepal Chamlang; Nepal Kyazo Ri; Antarctica Monte Pizduch; Pakistan Gasherbrum I; Antarctica Monte Samila; Nepal Talung; Afghanistan Kohe Uparisina; Pakistan Kapura Peak; India Mt.Meru; Nepal Kyashar; Kyrgyzstan Pamir-Alay(4810m); Kyrgyzstan Pamir-Alay(3850m); Chile Cerro Paine Grande; Pakistan Amin Brak; Peru Huandoy North
- Known for: First climb Gasherbrum I Southwest face

Marek Holeček (born 5 November 1974) is a Czech mountaineer, explorer, author and documentary filmmaker. Holeček has received the 2018 Piolet d'Or award for his successful full ascent on the southwest face of Gasherbrum I with Zdeněk Hák, which he achieved in Alpine style.

„My body has been systematically tortured for years in achieving one important skill for staying in the mountains, the art of hardship."

== Awards and honors ==
- 2018 Piolet d'Or award for full ascent on the southwest face of Gasherbrum I with Zdeněk Hák.
- Czech Mountaineering Association awarded the Best Ascent of 2017 – first ascent to the eight-thousander Gasherbrum I. in Alpine style. Co-climber: Zdeněk Hák
- Nomination for the Piolet d'Or 2014 Prize (F & I) for the first ascent of the north face of Talung (7,348 m), Nepal. Co-climber: Zdeněk Hrubý
- Honorable recognition at Golden Piton Award in 2006 (GB) for the first-ascent to Meru Central (6,310 m), India
- Czech Mountaineering Association honorable recognition – 1997, 1999, 2001, 2012, 2014
- Czech Mountaineering Association awarded the Best Ascent – 2000, 2002, 2003, 2006, 2008, 2013

== Gasherbrum I SW Face, Piolet d'Or Award 2018 ==
It took Holeček five attempts to finally complete his new route up the Southwest Face of Gasherbrum I, situated in the Baltoro region of Pakistan's Karakorum. Holeček succeeded together with his co-climber Zdeněk Hák on 30 July 2017. They named the new route Satisfaction! and they climbed it in pure Alpine style.

The route was rated ED+, M7, WI 5+, total inclination 70°.

In September 2018, they received the 2018 Piolet d'Or Award.

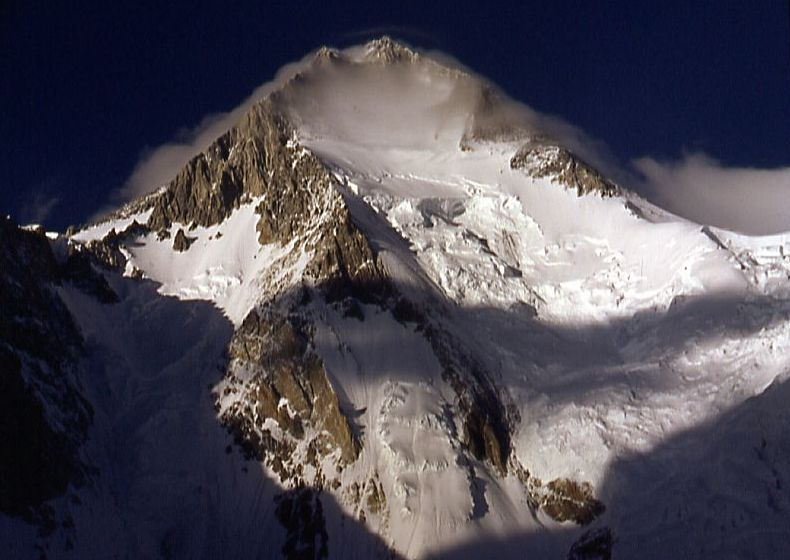
Gasherbrum I, HiddenPeak

=== "Satisfaction!" Journey ===
In 2009 he climbed up the lefthand ice couloir in the central section of the face of Gasherbrum. Together with his climbing partner, Zdeněk Hrubý, he solved the first crux of the mixed terrain, an unclear passage from the couloir to the col, through the rock bottleneck at 7,400 meters, after their second bivy. The next day they reached 7,500 m to the base of the rock barrier, but they were forced to escape which resulted in 2,000 m of rappelling and down climbing. Hrubý suffered from perforated ulcers.

In 2013, the attempt ended tragically for Zdeněk Hrubý who slipped and tumbled to his death, taking all their climbing gear with him.

Next followed the 2015 attempt, where Holeček reached 7,400 m with Tomáš Petreček and had to retreat in the midst of avalanches and bad weather.

In 2016, together with Ondřej Mandula, they reached 7,700 m, but they were pinned down at 7,500 m with no way to escape for eight days. By the time they got down, Holeček sustained frostbite on his feet, resulting in more than six months of recovery.

== Expeditions ==
=== Major Ascents ===
- October 2024 – First ascent via the east face of Langtang Lirung with climbing partner Ondrej Húserka, who died on the descent from the mountain.
- August 2019 - 2021 – Nepal, Baruntse 7162 m a.s.l. First ascent Z wall in alpine style. Climbing partner: Radoslav Groh. name of the route: Heavenly Trap, length of ascent: 1300m, climbed in 10 days, ABO+: VI+ M6+ 80?, Alpine style, climbing partner: Radoslav Groh
- August 2019 - Peru, Cordillera Blanca, Huandoy Norte – 6360m, name of the route: Boys 1970, North face, length of ascent: 1200m, climbed in 2 days, M6, WI6, Alpine style, climbing partner: Radoslav Groh
- May 2019 – Nepal, Himalayas, Chamlang – 7,321 m, name of the route: UFO Line, north-west face of Chamlang, length of ascent: 2,000 m, climbed in 6 days, ABO, Alpine style, climbing partner: Zdeněk Hák
- May 2018 – Nepal, Central Himalayas, Kyazo Ri – 6,186 m, name of the route: Lapse of Reason, start from the W face and finish on the E through the summit head, M6, WI 4+, 3+UIAA, ED+, length of ascent: 1,600 m, Alpine style, climbing partner: Zdeněk Hák
- January 2018 – Antarctica, Palmer Archipelago, Winkle Island, Monte Pizduch (1000 m a.s.l.), name of the route: Bloody Nose, SW wall, ED+ (M4/W15+) in one place 95°, length of ascent: 850 m, Alpine style, climbing partner: Mirek Dub
- July 2017 – Pakistan, Gasherbrum I. – 8,080 m, name of the route: Satisfaction!, SW wall, ED+ (M7, WI5+), slope 70°, length of ascent: 3,000 m, Alpine style, climbing partner: Zdeněk Hák, 2018 Piolet d'Or award
- January 2014 – Antarctica, Palmer Archipelago, Region Anvers Island, Monte Samila – 1,500 m, name of the route: Abdul's Blazing Calves, J wall WI5, slope 70°, Alpine style, length of ascent 1,700 m, climbing partner: Vladislav Nosek, Vladislav Jošt
- May 2013 – Nepal, Eastern Himalayas, Kanchenjunga region, Talung – 7,343 m, name of the route: Thumba Party, North Pillar (M6, W16), length of ascent: 2,100 m, duration of ascent: seven days, Alpine style, climbing partner: Zdeněk Hrubý, nomination for the Piolets d'Or 2014 Prize (F & I)
- September 2008 – Afghanistan, Vachán, Ishmurch Valley, Kohe Uparisina – 6,260 m, name of the route: Sweet 65, NW notch,(W15), slope 70°, length of ascent: 1,600 m, duration of ascent: four days, Alpine style, climbing partner: Jan Doudlebský
- July 2008 – Pakistan, Karakoram, Charakusa Valley, Kapura Peak – 6,200 m, name of the route: Wild Wings, West Peak, NW notch (WI5+ M7), slope 70°, length of ascent 1,300 m, duration of ascent: three days, Alpine style, climbing partner: Jan Doudlebský
- September – October 2006 – India, Garhwal Himalaya, Mt. Meru – 6,310 m, name of the route: Filka's Heavenly Laugh, NE wall – (7a M5) 80°, duration of ascent 13 days, Alpine style, length of ascent 2,000 m, climbing partner: Jan Kreisinger, honorable recognition at the Golden Piton Awards 2006 (GB)
- October – November 2005 – Nepal, Central Himalaya, Kyashar – 6,750 m, name of the route: Ramro Chaina, SE wall (M6+ WI6), length of ascent 1,900 m, duration of ascent: five days to the eastern saddle reaching 6,500 m, Alpine style, climbing partner: Jan Doudlebský
- July – August 2003 – Kyrgyzstan, Pamir-Alay – 3,850 m, name of the route: Otik's Victory (Ochtakurova paběda), N wall (7b A4), length of ascent: 750 m, duration of ascent: five days, Alpine style, climbing partners: David Šťastný, Otakar Vašek
- July – August 2002 – Kyrgyzstan, Pamir-Alay, PIK 4,810 – 4,810 m, name of the route: Otik's Wet Dream, NW wall (7b+/7c), length of ascent: 1,200 m, duration of ascent: eight days, Alpine style, climbing partners: Václav Šatava, Pavel Jonák
- July – August 2000 – Chile, Patagonia, Cerro Paine Grande – 2,460 m, name of the route: Macaroni Porridge Junction, E wall (7a A3+), length of ascent: 1,300 m, duration of ascent: 8 days, Alpine style, climbing partners: David Šťastný, Filip Šilhan

=== Other Ascents ===
- August 2018 – Pakistan, Himalayas, Nanga Parbat – 8,125 m, attempt to ascent the top of Nanga Parbat by the Southern Rupal Wall, the ascent ended at 7,600 m due to bad weather, climbing partner: Tomáš Petreček
- August 2016 – Pakistan, Eastern Karakoram, Abruzzi Glacier, Gasherbrum I. – 8,080 m, fourth attempt to first ascent the SW wall, due to unfavorable weather, they were trapped for eight days at an altitude of 7,700 m, climbing partner: Ondřej Mandula
- August 2015 – Pakistan, Eastern Karakoram, Abruzzi Glacier, Gasherbrum I. – 8,080 m, third attempt to first ascent the SW wall, due to unfavorable weather, they were trapped for six days at an altitude of 7,400 m, climbing partner: Tomáš Petreček
- August 2013 – Pakistan, Eastern Karakoram, Abruzzi Glacier, Gasherbrum I. – 8,080 m, expedition Never Stop Exploring – Gasherbrum I. 8,080 m, second attempt to first ascent the SW wall, climbing partner: Zdeněk Hrubý (he died on the descent on August 7, 2013)
- July 2012 – Pakistan, Himalayas, Nanga Parbat – 8,125 m, expedition: Wild Choice Comeback – Nanga Parbat 2012, ascended to the top of "Kinshofer route", duration of ascent: 11 days (from 5,800 m Alpine style), climbing partner: Zdeněk Hrubý
- July – August 2011 – Pakistan, Himalayas, Nanga Parbat – 8,125 m, expedition: Wild Choice – Nanga Parbat 2011, attempt by Marek Holeček to solo ascent to the top of Nanga Parbat by the Southern Rupal Wall, the ascent ended 800 meters below the summit due to bad weather, climbing partner: Zdeněk Hrubý
- February 2010 – Argentina, Andy, Aconcagua – 6,962 m, name of route: Polish Glacier- right, climbing partner: Zdeněk Hrubý
- 2009 – Pakistan, Eastern Karakoram, Abruzzi Glacier, Gasherbrum I. – 8,080 m, name of route: Japanese Swing from 1986, NW wall, vertical rise from BC 2,950 m, duration of ascent: four days, solo ascent
- August 2009 – Pakistan, Karakoram, Abruzzi Glacier, Gasherbrum I.' – 8,068 m, SW wall – attempted first ascent, climbing partner: Zdeněk Hrubý
- January – February 2001 – Chile, Patagonia, Escudo – 2,600 m, name of route: The Dream, first repetition, E wall (6b A4+), length of ascent: 1,200 m, duration of ascent: 20 days, Alpine style, climbing partners: Tomáš Rinn and Tomáš Sobotka
- February 1998 – France, Alps, Grandes Jorasses, name of the route: MacIntyre – Colton, 1976 from Colton/MacIntyre, N wall, ED2 A1 VI/6 90°, length of ascent: 1,150 m, duration of ascent: three days, climbing partner: Tomáš Rinn
- June 1997 – France, Alps, Grandes Jorasses, name of the route: Manitua 1991 from Svetičič, N wall (7+ A3+) 70°, length of ascent: 1,150 m, climbed six days, Alpine style, climbing partner: Tomáš Rinn
- July 1997 – India, Garhwal, Mt. Meru – 6,310 m, N wall, attempted first ascent, climbing partner: Filip Šilhán

== Publications ==
- Marek Holeček: Dotknout se nebe – Zápisky Marouška blázna, 1. edition, November, 2018, Computer Press, 256 pages, ISBN 978-80-264-2243-3
- Marek Holeček: České himalájské dobrodružství II – Zápisky Marouška blázna, 1. edition, Universum Praha, 2015, 256 pages, ISBN 978-80-242-5107-3
- Jiří Novák: Himálaj a Karakoram – československé a české prvovýstupy, 1. edition, Alpy Praha, November 2015, ISBN 978-80-85613-54-4

== Movies ==
- 2003: Sen, directed by Jiří Kratochvíl, movie about climbing in Yosemite
- 2007: Tous Européens! (French)
- 2009: Dotknout se nebe, TV documentary
- 2011: Chytnout nebe za kšandy, TV documentary
- 2016: The Elements, directed by Tomáš Galásek
