= Marko Rupnik =

Slovenian artist, theologian, and priest

The Reverend Dr. Marko Ivan Rupnik
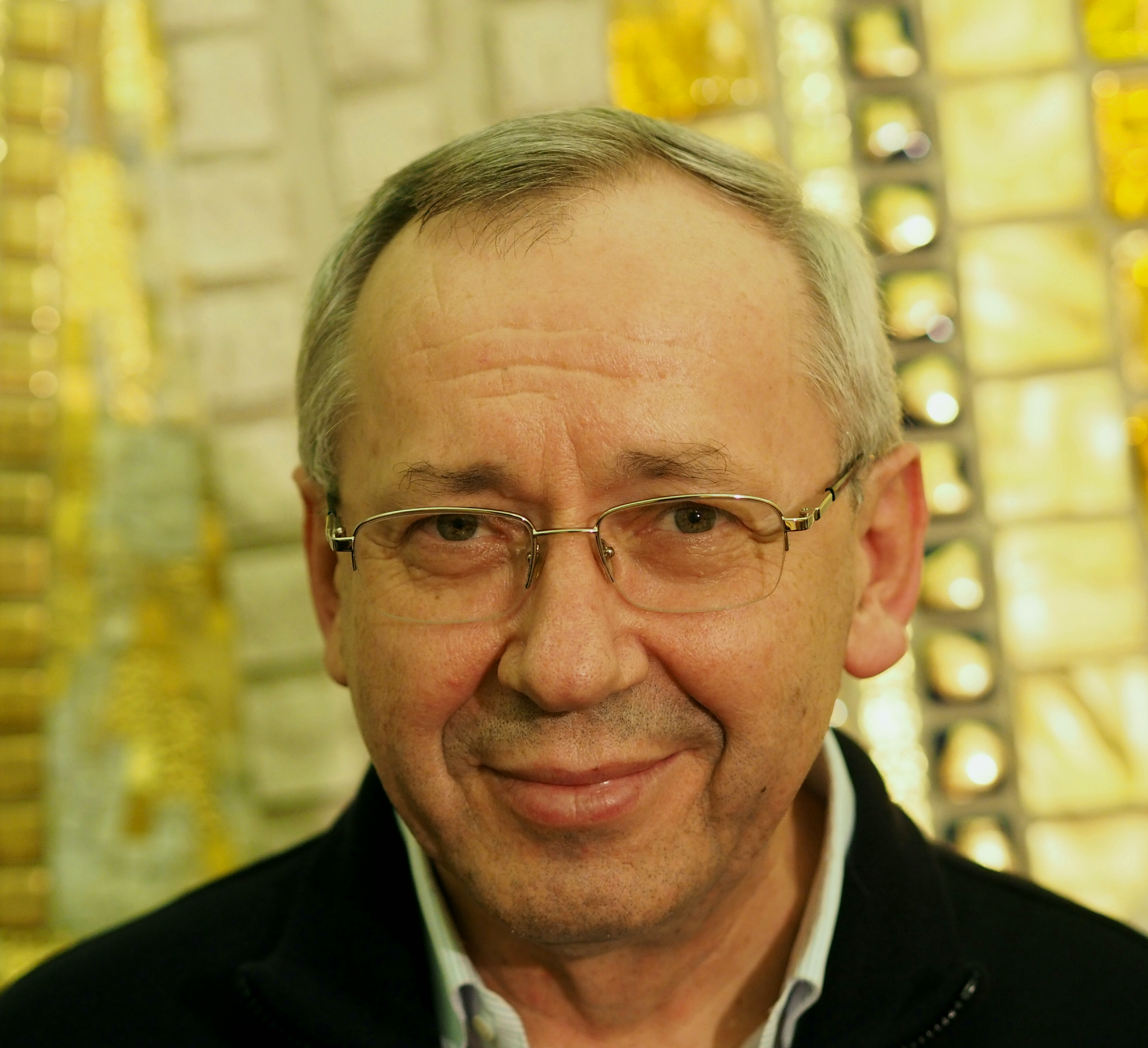
- Marko Rupnik in 2011
- Born: 28 November 1954 (age 71)
- Education: Academy of Fine Arts in Rome

Marko Ivan Rupnik (born 28 November 1954) is a Slovenian Catholic priest, theologian, mosaic artist, former Jesuit, and alleged rapist. Among the churches he has decorated around the world are the Saint John Paul II National Shrine in Washington D.C., the Redemptoris Mater Chapel in the Vatican's Apostolic Palace, the Sanctuary of Our Lady of Lourdes, the Sanctuary of Fátima, the Sanctuary of Saint Pio of Pietrelcina, the Almudena Cathedral in Madrid. He was the director of Centro Aletti in Rome.

In December 2022, Rupnik's excommunication due to the ecclesiastical crime of absolution of an accomplice and allegations about sexual misconduct became public knowledge. He was expelled from the Society of Jesus on 15 June 2023, for "stubborn refusal to observe the vow of obedience", by decree of the superior general Arturo Sosa. In October 2023, the Vatican case against Rupnik was reopened.

== Early life and education ==
Rupnik was born 28 November 1954 to Ivan and Ivanka Kaucic in Zadlog, a village in the Municipality of Idrija, in western Slovenia, at the time part of Yugoslavia. After finishing elementary school in Idrija, Rupnik continued his secondary education at the Minor Seminary in Vipava.

In 1973 Rupnik joined the Society of Jesus. After completing his novitiate, he studied philosophy at the Theological Seminary of Ljubljana, and then in 1977 enrolled at the Academy of Fine Arts in Rome, where he studied painting, graduating in 1981. He then enrolled in the theology program at the Pontifical Gregorian University in Rome.

In 1985 Rupnik was ordained a priest in Koper, but continued to study at the Gregorian, specializing now in missiology. From 1987 to 1991, he lived in Gorizia, in the Jesuit center Stella Matutina, where he worked while also writing his dissertation. In 1991 he received his doctorate in missiology from the Gregorian, with his thesis on "The Theological Missionary Meaning of Art in the Writings of Vjačeslav Ivanovič Ivanov".

== Artistic and theological career ==
In 1991, Rupnik returned to Rome, at the same time Tomáš Špidlík took up a residence at the newly founded Centro Alleti. Rupnik and Špidlík went on to become close friends, with Špidlík serving as a spiritual mentor for Rupnik. In 1995 Rupnik was appointed director of the newly founded "Spiritual Arts" division of Centro Aletti (Atelier d'Arte spirituale del Centro Aletti), a department of the Pontifical Oriental Institute. Centro Aletti was set up primarily for central and eastern European scholars and artists to interact with their western counterparts, and became specialized in mosaic creation. The distinctive feature of these mosaics is their vast size; built to entirely cover the walls of cathedrals, they often reach an extension of hundreds or even thousands of square meters. As of 2009, artistic production has also expanded to the Middle East, Oceania, and South and North America.

== Allegations of spiritual and sexual abuse ==
=== Investigations ===
The Society of Jesus issued a statement on 2 December 2022, confirming that Rupnik had undergone a canonical investigation in the previous months at the request of the Dicastery for the Doctrine of the Faith ("DDF"). In 2021 the DDF had received a complaint of alleged abuse against some nuns in 1995; no minors were involved in the allegations. The Society of Jesus then appointed a religious from another institute as external investigator, while Rupnik was placed under various restrictions, such as bans on hearing confessions, giving spiritual direction, conducting spiritual exercises, and engaging in public activities without a local superior's permission, as a precautionary measure. When the DDF received the result of the investigation, it dismissed the case: according to canon law, the statute of limitations expires after 20 years, whereas the charges referred to incidents almost 30 years earlier. However, one of the victims had in fact reported the abuse to the archbishop of Ljubljana, Alojzij Šuštar, and to Špidlík, at the time of the alleged abuse. Apparently as a consequence, in October 1993 Šuštar without explanation had removed Rupnik from the Loyola Community of Mengeš.

=== Conviction by the Holy See ===
The Jesuit superior general, Arturo Sosa, revealed on 14 December 2022 that, after a 2019 complaint, Rupnik had been convicted and sanctioned by the Holy See for the ecclesiastical crime of absolution of an accomplice. Rupnik had absolved a woman in confession of having engaged in sexual activity with him. With the authorisation of Pope Francis, a fellow Jesuit, Rupnik's excommunication was lifted after he repented for his crime, after a brief lapse of time, prompting an outcry over the Pope's integrity in the matter. Despite the earlier statement on 2 December 2022, the restrictions on Rupnik's ministry "actually dated from that confession-related conviction, and not the 2021 allegations that the Vatican's sex crimes office decided to shelve because they were deemed too old to prosecute."

After his conviction, Rupnik preached in 2020 a Lenten meditation for priests working in the Roman Curia, including Pope Francis and Luis Ladaria Ferrer, then-Prefect of the DDF, both fellow Jesuits. Rupnik created the logo for the 2022 World Meeting of Families and he met privately with Pope Francis on 3 January 2022. According to journalist Nicole Winfield, the "Rupnik's scandal has underscored the weaknesses in the Vatican's abuse policies concerning spiritual and sexual abuse of adult women, and how powerful priests can often count on high-ranking support even after credible allegations against them are lodged."

=== Expulsion from Jesuits and transfer to Koper ===
On 15 June 2023, following his "stubborn refusal to observe the vow of obedience", the Superior General Father Arturo Sosa expelled Rupnik from the Society of Jesus. No appeal of the expulsion was made within the one-month window given by Canon law, leading to the expulsion becoming permanent in July of the same year. The Centro Aletti Institute made a statement criticizing the Society of Jesus for not mentioning, at that Fr. Rupnik himself had asked permission to leave the order already in January 2023 after having lost all confidence in his superiors. In October 2023, it was released that Rupnik had been incardinated into the Slovenian Diocese of Koper in August. On 27 October 2023, Pope Francis lifted the statute of limitations to allow the case against Rupnik to reopen.

=== Public allegations ===
On 21 February 2024, Gloria Branciani, a former nun who was one of Rupnik's earliest accusers, made her story public for the first time. Branciani alleged, among other things, Rupnik subjected her to "spiritual, psychological and sexual abuse," forced her and another nun into three way sex with him and also had her visit pornographic theaters with him during a visit to Rome. It was also alleged Catholic hierarchs covered for Rupnik since Branciani first denounced him in 1993. The same day, Mirjam Kovac, another former nun who accused Rupnik of sexually abusing her, spoke as well, and also joined Branciani in urging for Pope Francis to have "an independent investigation of the hierarchy's handling of the allegations against Rupnik and to publish its findings."

The Annuario Pontificio of 2024 still lists Rupnik as a consultant of the Dicastery for Divine Worship and the Discipline of the Sacraments. In March of the same year, the Jesuits offered reparations to 20 women who had been abused by the artist.

=== Canonical trial ===
In March 2025, the Dicastery for the Doctrine of the Faith began selecting judges for a canonical trial of Rupnik. According to Cardinal Víctor Fernández, the process was slowed by the need to find judges who were not actively serving in the Roman Curia. By October of the same year, five judges, including women and clerics who are not members of the DDF, were empaneled. In mid 2026, the Vatican sought to deny rumors that the trial had already ended with Rupnik's acquittal, emphasizing that the secrecy of the process meant sharing ongoing updates was impossible.

=== Film ===
A film, Nuns vs the Vatican, directed by Lorena Luciano and executive-produced by Mariska Hargitay was first shown at the 2025 Toronto International Film Festival on 6 September 2025. It centres around two of the dozens of alleged victims of Rupnik, Gloria Branciani and Mirjam Kovac, and was described as further exploring a complicated stain on Pope Francis's legacy.

== Works ==
=== Mosaics ===
Rupnik's art includes a number of large-scale mosaics installed at high-profile shrines and Catholic institutions. These works have been controversial for their high profile, devotional nature, and for having been created during the same time as his alleged abuse. The Vatican eventually ordered all Rupnik's art to be removed from its websites.

- Saint John Paul II National Shrine in Washington, D.C.
- Blessed Sacrament chapel in the Almudena Cathedral in Madrid, Spain
- Facade of the Basilica of Our Lady of the Rosary at Lourdes, France
- Holy Family Chapel, Knights of Columbus headquarters, New Haven, Connecticut
- Church of Saint Peter and Paul in Mostar, Bosnia and Herzegovina
- Church of Saint John Paul II, Krakow, Poland
- Basilica of the National Shrine of the Blessed Virgin of Ta' Pinu, Malta
- Sanctuary of Saint Pio of Pietrelcina, San Giovanni Rotondo, Italy
- Basilica of the Holy Trinity, Fátima, Portugal
- Redemptoris Mater Chapel, Vatican City

=== Books ===
English editions:

- In the Fire of the Burning Bush: An Initiation to the Spiritual Life by Marko Ivan Rupnik (2004) ISBN 0-8028-2832-9
- Discernment: Acquiring the Heart of God by Marko Ivan Rupnik (2006) ISBN 0-8198-1882-8
- Human Frailty, Divine Redemption: The Theology and Practice of the Examen by Marko Ivan Rupnik (2012) ISBN 978-0-8198-3410-2
- Contemplating the face of Christ: a way of the cross by Marko Ivan Rupnik (2018) ISBN 978-0-8198-1669-6
- According to the Spirit: Spiritual theology on the move with Pope Francis' Church by Marko Ivan Rupnik and Salesians of Don Bosco (2019) ISBN 978-0-6484977-3-8
