= Acta Curiae =

Acta Curiae (Latin meaning "acts of court"), are records of the proceedings in ecclesiastical courts and in quasi-ecclesiastical courts, particularly of universities. They are sometimes also known as Registers of the Chancellor's (or Vice-Chancellor's) Court. This type of court was often used by local people who were college servants, to settle minor legal disputes. Records of a Vice-Chancellor's Court at the University of Cambridge, exist from 1549 to 1883.
