= Radek Jaroš =

Czech mountaineer and author (born 1964)

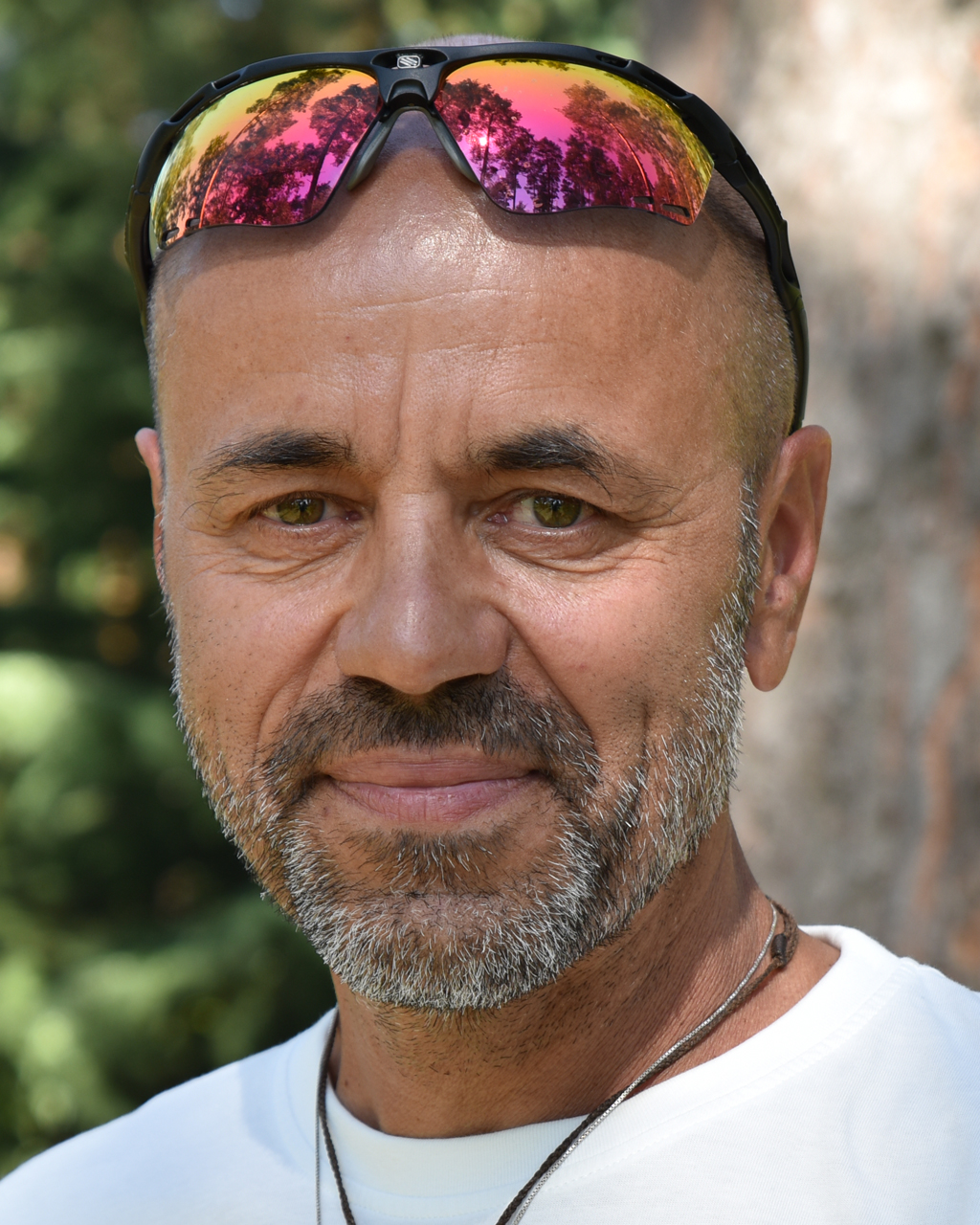
- Radek Jaroš (2023)

Personal information
- Nationality: Czech
- Born: 29 April 1964 (age 62) Nové Město na Moravě, Czechoslovakia

Radek Jaroš (born 29 April 1964) is a Czech mountaineer and author.

== Early life and career ==
Jaroš was born in Nové Město na Moravě, Czechoslovakia, now Czech Republic. In 1998 he climbed his first eight-thousander Mount Everest in the second attempt via its north face. In 2001, 2003 and 2005 he unsuccessfully tried to climb K2. In 2002, along with Martin Minařík he climbed Kanchenjunga as the first Czech. In 2006 announced he planned to conquer all the eight-thousand peaks of the world. As of 2024, he is the only Czech climber to conquer all 14 eight-thousanders and thus complete the "Crown of the Himalaya". Moreover, he was able to climb all of these mountains without using supplemental oxygen, which made him the world's 15th person to achieve this feat.

== Successful ascents on eight-thousanders ==
- 1998: Mount Everest
- 2002: Kangchenjunga
- 2003: Broad Peak
- 2004: Cho Oyu
- 2004: Shishapangma
- 2005: Nanga Parbat
- 2008: Dhaulagiri
- 2008: Makalu
- 2009: Manaslu (solo)
- 2010: Gasherbrum II
- 2010: Gasherbrum I
- 2011: Lhotse (solo)
- 2012: Annapurna
- 2014: K2
