= Otmar Oliva =

Czech sculptor

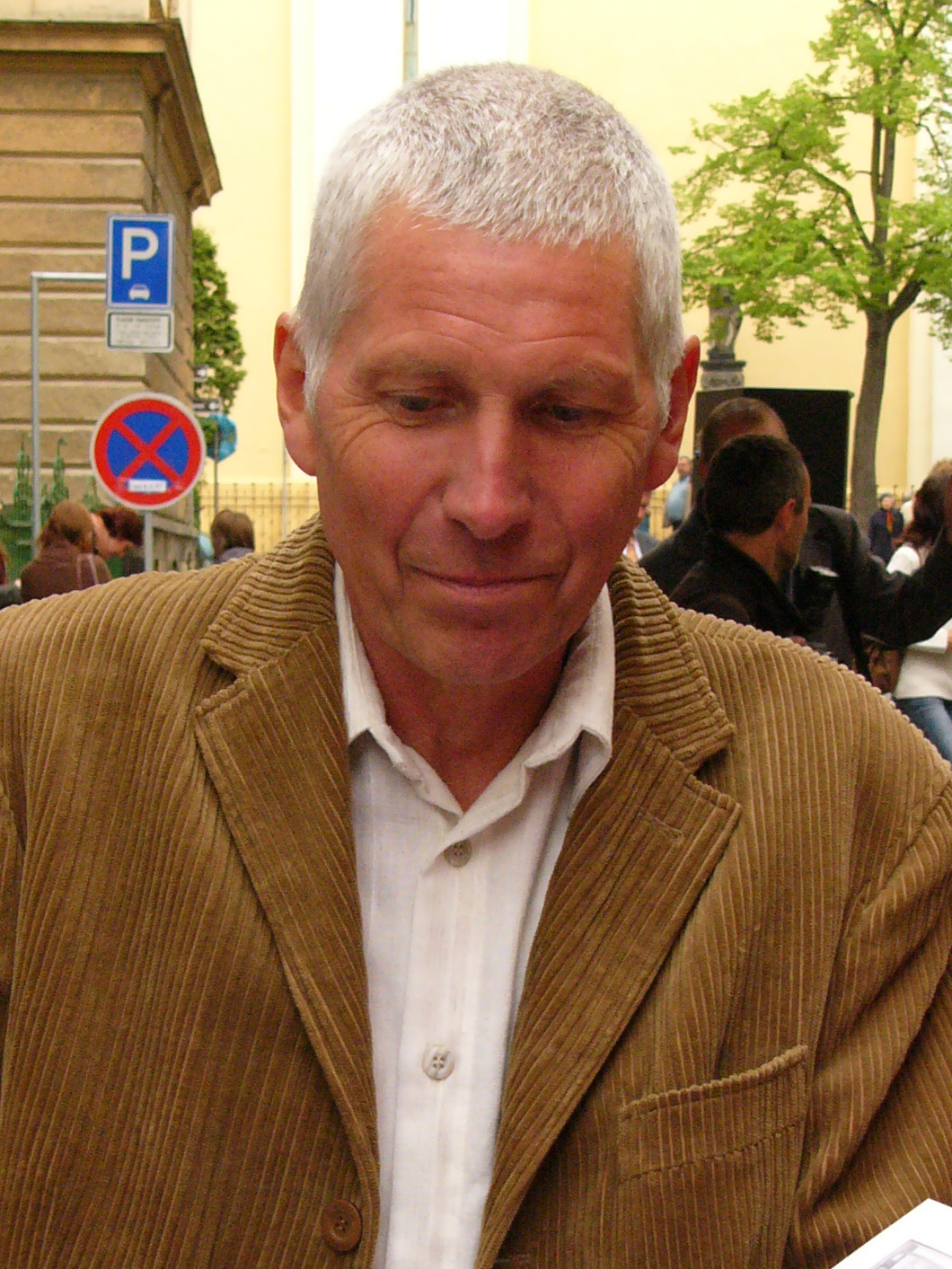
- Otmar Oliva in 2007
- Born: 19 February 1952 (age 74); Olomouc, Czechoslovakia
- Education: Academy of Fine Arts, Prague
- Notable work: Decoration of Redemptoris Mater Chapel
- Style: Religious sculpture
- Spouse: Olga Vrzalová
- Awards: Masaryk Academy of Arts Award, Statute of the City of Olomouc, the Third Resistance Memorial Medal, the Order of St. Cyril and Methodius, Knight of Czech Culture
- Patrons: The Holy See

Otmar Oliva (born 19 February 1952) is a Czech sculptor and former political prisoner. He specializes in the creation of liturgical objects and the arrangement of sacral buildings.

== Biography ==
Oliva was born on 19 February 1952 in Olomouc-Hodolany. His mother was a political prisoner and his father was a war veteran and member of the anti-Nazi resistance. In 1967–1972, he studied sculpture at the Secondary School of Applied Arts in Uherské Hradiště and in 1972–1978, he studied sculpture at Academy of Fine Arts, Prague. He was actively involved in dissent and issuing and distributing samizdat documents of Charter 77. He was arrested in 1979 and became a political prisoner for 20 months.

After returning from prison in 1981, he got married. Since 1985, he was living and creating art in Velehrad. He created many sculptures of a predominantly sacred nature, and specialised himself mainly in the decoration of bells. He remained active in dissent. After the Velvet Revolution, he continued his artistic creation in his studio in Velehrad, where he also casts his sculptures. His masterpiece is the decoration of the papal Redemptoris Mater Chapel in Vatican City in 1994.

== Work ==
Oliva decorated many objects with liturgical ornaments. His notable works include:

- Redemptoris Mater Chapel in Vatican City
- Church of Our Lady Mother of the Church in Maribor, Slovenia
- Basilica in Velehrad
- Svatá Hora in Příbram
- Church of Our Lady of Victory in Karmelitská Street in Prague 1
