= Ecclesiastical court =

Court having jurisdiction in Christian religious matters

In organized Christianity, an ecclesiastical court, also called court Christian or court spiritual, is any of certain non-adversarial courts conducted by church-approved officials having jurisdiction mainly in spiritual or religious matters. Historically, they interpret or apply canon law. One of its primary bases was the Corpus Juris Civilis of Justinian, which is also considered the source of the civil law legal tradition.

In the United Kingdom, secular courts that took over the functions of the ecclesiastic courts, e.g. in family law, are still known as courts ecclesiastical as distinct from courts temporal.

== Medieval courts ==
In the Middle Ages, ecclesiastical courts had much wider powers in many areas of Europe than they did after the development of nation states. They held jurisdiction over not only religious matters, but also family law, equitable relief, probate, and cases involving priests, religious communities, or public heretics.

Secular courts in medieval times were numerous and decentralized: each secular division (king, prince, duke, lord, abbot or bishop as landholder, manor, city, forest, market, etc.) could have their own courts, customary law, bailiffs and gaols (Note: "Medieval England was legally plural: there were not just many jurisdictions, but many different kinds of jurisdiction in co-existence." As well, centuries of rewarding special rights to favorites by royal charter or papal dispensation complicated matters.) with arbitrary and unrecorded procedures, including in Northern Europe trial by combat and trial by ordeal, and in England trial by jury.

Ecclesiastical courts generally followed the better regulated inquisition, accusation or denunciation judicial procedures. In medieval times, they had a very wide jurisdiction including family law and dowry disputes, (Note: Jewish courts were recognized in some places, especially for family law issues.) probate, equity, defamation, failure to observe holy days, and cases involving priests and religious communities and individuals or public heretics.

== Anglicanism ==
=== Church of England ===
In the Church of England, the ecclesiastical courts are a system of courts, held by authority of the Crown, who is ex officio the Supreme Governor of the Church of England. The courts have jurisdiction over matters dealing with the rights and obligations of church members, since the 19th century limited to controversies in areas of church property and ecclesiastical disciplinary proceedings. In England these courts, unlike common law courts, are based upon and operate along civil law procedures and Canon law-based jurisprudence.

The ecclesiastical courts formerly had jurisdiction over the personal estates of deceased persons to grant probate or administration. This jurisdiction of the Ecclesiastical Courts was transferred to the Court of Probate by the Court of Probate Act 1857.

Offences against ecclesiastical laws are dealt with differently based on whether the laws in question involve church doctrine. For non-doctrinal cases, the lowest level of the court is the Archdeaconry Court, which is presided over by the local archdeacon. The next court in the hierarchy is the bishop's court, which is in the Diocese of Canterbury called the Commissary Court and in other dioceses the consistory court. The Commissary Court is presided over by a commissary-general; a consistory Court is presided over by a chancellor. The chancellor or commissary-general must be thirty years old and either have a seven-year general qualification under the Courts and Legal Services Act 1990 section 71 or have held high judicial office.

Specialist courts in the Province of Canterbury are the Court of Faculties, the Court of Peculiars and the Court of the Vicar-General of the Province of Canterbury. In the northern province there is the Court of the Vicar-General of the Province of York.

The next court is the archbishop's court, which is in Canterbury called the Arches Court, and in York the Chancery Court. Each court includes five judges; one judge is common to both courts. The common judge is called the Dean of Arches in Canterbury and the Auditor in York; he or she is appointed jointly by both archbishops with the approval of the Crown, and must either hold a ten-year High Court qualification under the Courts and Legal Services Act 1990, s 71, or have held high judicial office. Two members of each court must be clergy appointed by the Prolocutor of the Lower House of the provincial convocation. (Note: Canterbury and York each have a bicameral Convocation, made up of the Upper House (composed of bishops) and the Lower House (composed of representatives of the clergy).) Two further members of each court are appointed by the Chairman of the House of Laity of the General Synod; (Note: The General Synod, a tricameral body, is the highest governing body of the Church. The House of Bishops is composed of the Upper Houses of the two convocations; the House of Clergy is composed of the Lower Houses of the two convocations; the House of Laity includes representatives of lay members of the Church.) these must possess such legal qualifications as the Lord High Chancellor of Great Britain requires.

In cases involving church doctrine, ceremony or ritual, the aforementioned courts have no jurisdiction. Instead, the Court of Ecclesiastical Causes Reserved hears the case. The Court is composed of three diocesan bishops and two appellate judges; it has jurisdiction over both of the provinces of Canterbury and York. The Court, however, meets very rarely.

Appeal from the Arches Court and Chancery Court (in non-doctrinal cases) lies to the King-in-Council. In practice, the case is heard by the Judicial Committee of the Privy Council, which includes present and former Lords Chancellor, a number of Lords of Appeal and other high judicial officers. The King-in-Council does not have jurisdiction over doctrinal cases from the Court of Ecclesiastical Causes Reserved, which instead go to an ad hoc Commission of Review, composed of two diocesan bishops and three Lords of Appeal (who are also members of the Judicial Committee).

The operation of such courts was not without cost. For instance, in 1843, the gross fees, salaries, emoluments of the judges, deputy-judges, registrars, deputy-registrars, and all other officers in the ecclesiastical courts of England, Wales and Ireland, amounted to £120,513, of which £101,171 was the figure for England.

Commissions of Convocation were appointed by the Upper House of the Convocation of Canterbury or of York to try a bishop for an offence (except for an offence of doctrine). Both Convocations make the appointment if an archbishop is prosecuted. This would comprise four diocesan bishops and the Dean of the Arches. They were discontinued by the Clergy Discipline Measure 2003.

The Ecclesiastical Courts Acts 1787 to 1860 is the collective title of the following Acts:

- The Ecclesiastical Suits Act 1787 (27 Geo. 3. c. 44) – repealed by Statute Law Revision Act 1948,
- The Ecclesiastical Courts Act 1813 (53 Geo. 3. c. 127) – repealed by Statute Law (Repeals) Act 1971,
- The Proctors (Ireland) Act 1814 (54 Geo. 3. c. 68) – repealed by Statute Law Revision Act (Northern Ireland) 1954,
- The Ecclesiastical Courts Act 1829 (10 Geo. 4. c. 53) – repealed by Ecclesiastical Jurisdiction Measure 1963,
- The Privy Council Appeals Act 1832 (2 & 3 Will. 4. c. 92) – repealed by Ecclesiastical Jurisdiction Measure 1963,
- The Ecclesiastical Courts (Contempt) Act 1832 (3 & 4 Will. 4. c. 93) – repealed by Ecclesiastical Jurisdiction Measure 1963,
- The Ecclesiastical Courts Act 1840 (3 & 4 Vict. c. 93) – repealed by Ecclesiastical Jurisdiction Measure 1963,
- The Ecclesiastical Courts Act 1844 (7 & 8 Vict. c. 68) – repealed by Statute Law Revision Act 1959,
- The Ecclesiastical Jurisdiction Act 1847 (10 & 11 Vict. c. 98) – repealed by Church of England (Miscellaneous Provisions) Measure 1992,
- The Ecclesiastical Courts Act 1854 (17 & 18 Vict. c. 47) – repealed by Ecclesiastical Jurisdiction Measure 1963,
- The Ecclesiastical Courts Act 1855 (18 & 19 Vict. c. 41) – repealed by Ecclesiastical Jurisdiction Measure 1963,
- The Ecclesiastical Jurisdiction Act 1858 (21 & 22 Vict. c. 50) – repealed by Statute Law Revision Act 1950,
- The Ecclesiastical Courts Jurisdiction Act 1860 (23 & 24 Vict. c. 32) – amended.

==== Guernsey ====
The Ecclesiastical Court in Guernsey predates its first written evidence from the 13th Century. Its powers have been reduced over the centuries but it still meets weekly to prove wills and to grant marriage licences.

=== Episcopal Church in the United States of America ===
Ecclesiastical courts in the American Episcopal Church have jurisdiction only over disciplinary cases involving clergy and are divided into two separate systems: one for trials of bishops (at the level of the national Episcopal Church) and the other for trials of priests and deacons (at the level of the diocese for original jurisdiction and at the provincial level for appeals). (At least one diocese, however, Diocese of Minnesota, has provided in its canons for a court with broader jurisdiction over a wide range of canonical issues, although such a court has not yet been implemented by the convention of that diocese.) In each disciplinary case, two courts are provided, one for trials and one for appeals. When a charge is first made, it is brought before an initial review committee (similar to a grand jury in secular criminal law) whose job is to determine when a case should be brought and to supervise the Church Attorney who acts as a sort of prosecutor.

Courts and procedure for trials of bishops are provided for by the Canons of the General Convention (the triennial legislative body of the national church). There is one Court for the Trial of a bishop, composed of nine bishops (though there have been proposals to include lay persons and lower clergy in this court). Appeals are heard by the Court of Review for the Trial of a bishop, also comprising nine bishops. The Constitution of the national Episcopal Church provides that this court must be composed only of bishops.

For priests and deacons, initial trial is held by an ecclesiastical court established by the diocese in which the cleric is canonically resident. Appeals are taken to the Court of Review for the Trial of a Priest or Deacon, one of which is established in each of the nine provinces of the Episcopal Church (a province is a geographic combination of dioceses). Dioceses have some discretion about the procedure and membership for the ecclesiastical court, but most rules and procedure are established church-wide by the national canons. Trial courts are made up of lay persons and of priests or deacons, with the clergy to have a majority by one. The various courts of review comprise one bishop, three priests or deacons, and three lay persons.

Since the 18th century the Constitution of the national Episcopal Church has permitted the creation of a national Court of Appeal, which would be "solely for the review of the determination of any Court of Review on questions of Doctrine, Faith, or Worship". No such court has ever been created, though proposals have occasionally been made to establish the House of Bishops itself as such a court.

=== Anglican Church in North America ===
Trials of clergy within the Anglican Church in North America take place according to canons of individual dioceses, while trials of bishops are conducted by a seven-member Court for the Trial of a Bishop, comprising three bishops, two priests and two confirmed adult members. Cases are referred to the court by a board of inquiry appointed by the archbishop. The board decides whether a presentment, which must be signed by at least three diocesan bishops or by a sufficient number of clergy and laity from within the accused bishop's diocese, offers probable cause to present the bishop for trial.

Unlike disciplinary hearings of the Episcopal Church, the court's proceedings may be held virtually and may be closed to the public and to media. The ACNA canons establish an adversarial system in which a prosecutor represents the province and the accused (who is presumed innocent) may obtain representation. A majority of the court members is required for a verdict to be reached on a charge. A bishop found guilty may appeal to the seven-member Provincial Tribunal. As of 2025, the court has heard two cases, one involving Todd Atkinson and the ongoing ecclesiastical trial of Stewart Ruch.

== Catholicism ==
The tribunals of the modern-day Catholic Church are governed by the 1983 Code of Canon Law in the case of the Western Church (Latin Church), and the Code of Canons of the Eastern Churches in the case of the Eastern Catholic Churches (Byzantine, Ukrainian, Maronite, Melkite, etc.). Both systems of canon law underwent general revisions in the late 20th century, resulting in the new code for the Latin Church in 1983, and the compilation for the first time of the Eastern Code in 1990.

=== First instance ===
Cases normally originate in the tribunal of the particular church (i.e. the diocese or eparchy) of the parties to the case. This tribunal in canon law is called the tribunal of first instance. The bishop of the church possesses the power to judge for his church; however, since the bishop has many different duties in his diocese, most cases are handled by judges whom he appoints, led by a priest known as the judicial vicar or officialis.

A single judge can handle normal contentious and penal cases. A college of at least three judges, however, must try cases involving an excommunication, the dismissal of a cleric, or the annulment of the bond of marriage or of sacred ordination (can. 1425 §1). The bishop can assign up to five judges to a case that is very difficult or important (can. 1425 §2). Otherwise, the judicial vicar assigns cases to the judges and, in those cases which require three or more judges, presides over the panel or assigns one of his assistant judicial vicars to preside, if there are any. The judicial vicar and the assistant judicial vicars must be priests with doctorates or at least licentiates in canon law. The other judges need only be clerics with licentiates, but the episcopal conference can permit members of the laity with the same academic qualifications to serve as judges on a panel.

There are other officers of the tribunal. The promoter of justice, for instance, is a canon lawyer whose job is to represent the diocese as the prosecutor in penal cases and who also can intervene in contentious cases if they concern the "public good", acting as a watch dog for the people of the diocese. Another important officer is the defender of the bond, another canon lawyer whose job is to present reasons to the tribunal why a marriage is valid in cases of alleged nullity and why an ordination is valid in the rare cases of alleged nullity of Holy Orders. The tribunal also has notaries who swear in witnesses and commit their testimony to writing. Parties in a case have the right to appoint an advocate who can argue for them at the tribunal. If a person cannot afford an advocate, the tribunal can assign one to them free of charge.

Unlike courts of common law tradition, ecclesiastical tribunals do not follow the adversarial system. Based on the same Roman civil law that is behind much European law, the procedure of a canonical court is more akin to the inquisitorial system, with the judges leading the investigation. As a general rule, the defendant has the favorable presumption of law, which means that the defendant will win by default unless a majority of the judges is convinced with moral certainty of the petitioner's case (can. 1608). This presumption also applies in penal cases (can. 1728). There are few exceptions to this rule; in those cases, the burden shifts to the defendant.

Some matters cannot be introduced at the diocesan level and can only be introduced before the following:

- Appellate tribunal for the diocese: cases against the diocese itself or an institution represented by the diocesan bishop
- Roman Rota: cases against the heads of religious orders, cases against dioceses or church institutions that are immediately subject to the Holy See, and non-penal cases against bishops
- The Pope himself: any case where a cardinal, Eastern rite patriarch, papal legate, or head of state is a defendant and any penal case involving a bishop.

=== Appeal ===
The appellate tribunal is known as the tribunal of second instance. Normally the second instance tribunal is the tribunal of the metropolitan bishop. In the case where the appeal is from a first instance decision of the metropolitan's own tribunal, the appeal is taken to a court which the metropolitan designated with approval of the Holy See, usually another nearby metropolitan, thus ensuring that appeals from one diocese are never heard by the same diocese. As an example, a case in the Diocese of Springfield, Massachusetts, would be appealed to the tribunal of the Archdiocese of Boston, but a case originating in the Archdiocese of Boston would be appealed to the tribunal of the Archdiocese of New York, by agreement between the archbishops of New York and Boston.

Some cases are automatically appealed (for instance, when a marriage was found to be null prior to Pope Francis’ 2015 reforms). The appealing party does not need to appeal to the metropolitan; the party can instead appeal to the Holy See, in which case the Roman Rota would hear the case in the second instance. If the case was before the Rota in the first instance, then a different panel of the Rota hears it in the second instance.

With the exception of cases regarding personal status, if the first instance and second instance tribunals agree on the result of the case, then the case becomes res judicata and there is no further appeal. If they disagree, then the case can be appealed to the Roman Rota, which serves as the tribunal of third instance. The Rota is a court of fifteen judges called auditors who take cases in panels of three and serve as the final arbiters of most cases.

There is no appeal from a court case that the Pope has decided personally.

=== Other tribunals ===
The Roman Curia has two other tribunals which either deal with specialized cases or which do not deal with cases at all. The first is the Apostolic Signatura, a panel of five cardinals which serves as the highest court in the Roman Catholic Church. Normal cases rarely reach the Signatura, the exception being if a party appeals to the Pope and he assigns the case to them or if the Pope on his own initiative pulls a case from another court and gives it to them. The court mainly handles cases regarding the use of administrative power, including penal cases which were decided using executive instead of judicial power, which is the usual case. It also handles disputes between dicasteries and other tribunals over jurisdiction, complaints that a Rotal decision is null and should be retried, and matters regarding advocates and inter-diocesan tribunals.

There is normally no right of appeal from the decision of the Apostolic Signatura (can. 1629 #1); however, laypersons and clerics have, on rare occasions, convinced the Pope to hear their case afterwards. This is usually reserved for cases where they are facing excommunication or some other form of severe censure, such as the loss of the right to teach theology or to administer the sacraments. Facing censure, a theologian and priest convinced Pope John Paul II to hear his case and even asked the Pope to alter his own decision, though the Pope did not reverse the ruling in either case.

The other tribunal is the Apostolic Penitentiary. This tribunal has no jurisdiction in what is known as "the external forum", meaning cases and events which are publicly known, only matters of the "internal forum", which involve entirely confidential and secret matters, including (but not limited to) what is confessed in the Sacrament of Penance. It primarily deals with cases that arise only within the confessional and which by their nature are private, confidential or whose facts are secret. Such cases are normally brought before the court by a person's confessor, who writes up the relevant facts of the cases, but only what is absolutely necessary, using standardized Latin pseudonyms. The confidentiality of the person, and the priest's absolute obligation to preserve the secrecy of the Sacrament of Penance, are still in force in such cases. This court, under the authority of the Cardinal Major Penitentiary, who acts in the Pope's name, answers the confessor and empowers him to impose a penance and lift a penalty. For instance, the act of desecrating the Eucharist is one which incurs an automatic excommunication for the person who so acts (an excommunication from the moment of the act, which no court need actually meet to impose), and the power to lift this excommunication is reserved by the Pope to himself. Should this person then approach a priest in confession, repentant, and explain his act and the fact that he acted in secret, the confessor would write to the tribunal laying out the simplest outline of facts, keeping the person's identity secret, and would most likely be empowered to lift the excommunication and impose some private act of penance on the person.

== Eastern Orthodoxy ==
The dioceses of many Eastern Orthodox denominations, such as the Russian Orthodox Church, have their own ecclesiastical courts. In addition, the Russian Orthodox Church has a General Ecclesiastical Court with jurisdiction throughout the Russian Orthodox Church, as well as the Court of the Bishops’ Council which serves as the court of final appeal. Under the Russian Empire, Russian Orthodox ecclesiastical courts held jurisdiction over cases of adultery, incest, bestiality, and blasphemy. They also held responsibility for divorce, which could only be obtained in cases of adultery.

The Greek Eastern Orthodox churches have ecclesiastical courts. For example, the Archdiocese of Thyateira and Great Britain under the spiritual jurisdiction of the Patriarchate of Constantinople has such courts for determining whether to grant divorce after the State has.

== Methodism ==
The Judicial Council is the highest court in the United Methodist Church. It consists of nine members, both laity and clergy, elected by the General Conference for an eight-year term. The ratio of laity to clergy alternates every four years. The Judicial Council interprets the Book of Discipline between sessions of General Conference, and during General Conference the Judicial Council rules on the constitutionality of laws passed by General Conference. The Council also determines whether actions of local churches, annual conferences, church agencies, and bishops are in accordance with church law. The Council reviews all decisions of law made by bishops The Judicial Council cannot create any legislation; it can only interpret existing legislation. The Council meets twice a year at various locations throughout the world. The Judicial Council also hears appeals from those who have been accused of chargeable offenses that can result in defrocking or revocation of membership.

== Mormonism ==
In the Church of Jesus Christ of Latter-day Saints, church courts are formally known as church membership councils. Church courts consider possible membership withdrawal or restriction based on a member's violation of church standards. Any stake, ward, or mission of the church may convene a church court.

The Common Council of the Church—which has only been convened twice—is a church court which has the authority to remove a president of the church or one of his counselors in the First Presidency for misbehavior.

== Presbyterianism ==
The Presbyterian Church (U.S.A.) has Permanent Judicial Commissions for each synod, presbytery and the General Assembly of the denomination, all of which are elected by members and are composed of ministers and elders subject to its jurisdiction. The PJC of the General Assembly consists of one member from each of the sixteen synods which compose the denomination and the PJC has original jurisdiction over remedial cases and appeals.

== See also ==
- Acta Curiae
- Courts of England and Wales
- Ecclesiastical crime
- Ecclesiastical ordinances
- Ecclesiastical prison
- Officiality
- Trial by ordeal
