= Franciszek Rychnowski =

Polish engineer

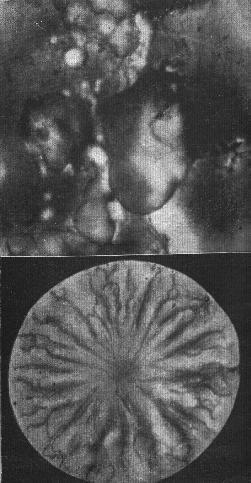
Rychnowski's plasma spheres

Franciszek Rychnowski (3 October 1850 – 3 July 1929) was a Polish engineer and an inventor. He also lectured at the Lwów Politechnic. In addition to mundane projects (he was involved with electrification, central heating and the tram system in Lwów, which is now Lviv, Ukraine), he also gained fame for his pseudoscientific theories on eteroid, similar to the concepts of élan vital or orgone; involvement with such pseudoscientific theories eventually ruined his career.

== Life ==
Rychnowski was born on 3 October 1850 in Velehrad, Moravia, Austrian Empire. He was educated in a Piarist school and then in the Vienna College of Technology. In 1877, he moved to Lviv, where he settled permanently. He started to use the pseudonym Iks von Chyr, which is Rychnovski backwards.

He died on 3 July 1929 in Lviv. He was buried into the family tomb in Kraków.

== In popular culture ==
Rychnowski is a minor character in a series of books by the modern Polish author, Andrzej Pilipiuk. He is also one of the central characters in the 2012 fictional conspiracy thriller The Man With the Devil's Hand by Jarek Garliński, and a significant background character in the tabletop game Leviathans.

== See also ==
- Jan Szczepanik
