= Pontifical Committee for Historical Sciences =

The Pontifical Committee of Historical Sciences is a division of the Roman Curia established on 7 April 1954 by Pope Pius XII.

== Background ==
Pope Pius XII created this committee on 7 April 1954 as the successor to the Commission of Cardinals for Historical Studies, which Pope Leo XIII had created on 18 August 1883 with the apostolic letter Saepenumero considerantes. That commission was created to contribute to the development and proper use of historical sciences, especially late in the nineteenth century when parts of the Vatican's historical records, known as the Vatican Secret Archive, was opened to scholars. The new committee was created to foster cooperation with the International Committee of Historical Sciences, which was scheduled to hold its convention in Rome in 1955.

On 14 January 2019 Pope Francis created the new role of the assessor as third leadership position, after the president and the secretary.

== Recent events ==
In 2011, the committee held a conference devoted to St. Catherine of Siena. In 2012 it marked the 1700th anniversary of the Battle of Ponte Milvio with a conference called "Constantine the Great. To the roots of Europe". A 2014 conference considered the legacy of Pope Pius X. In 2017, the committee sponsored a three-day conference called "Luther: 500 Years Later" to examine the non-theological context of the origins of the Protestant Reformation.

== Leadership ==
=== Presidents ===
- Pio Paschini (1954 – 20 August 1962)
- Michele Maccarrone (1963–1989)
- Victor Saxer (1989–1998)
- Walter Brandmüller (13 June 1998 – 3 December 2009)
- Bernard Ardura, O. Praem. (3 December 2009 – 14 September 2023)
- Marek Inglot, S.J. (14 September 2023-present)

=== Secretaries ===
- Michele Maccarrone (1954–1963)
- José Ruysschaert (1963–1973)
- Amato Pietro Frutaz (1973–1980)
- Raffaele Farina, S.D.B. (1981–1989)
- Vittorino Grossi, O.E.S.A. (1989–2002)
- Cosimo Semeraro, S.D.B. (16 November 2002 – 16 May 2013)
- Luigi Michele De Palma (16 May 2013 – present)

=== Assessors ===
- Enrico dal Covolo (2019 – present)
