= Redemptoris Mater Chapel =

Building in Rome, Italy

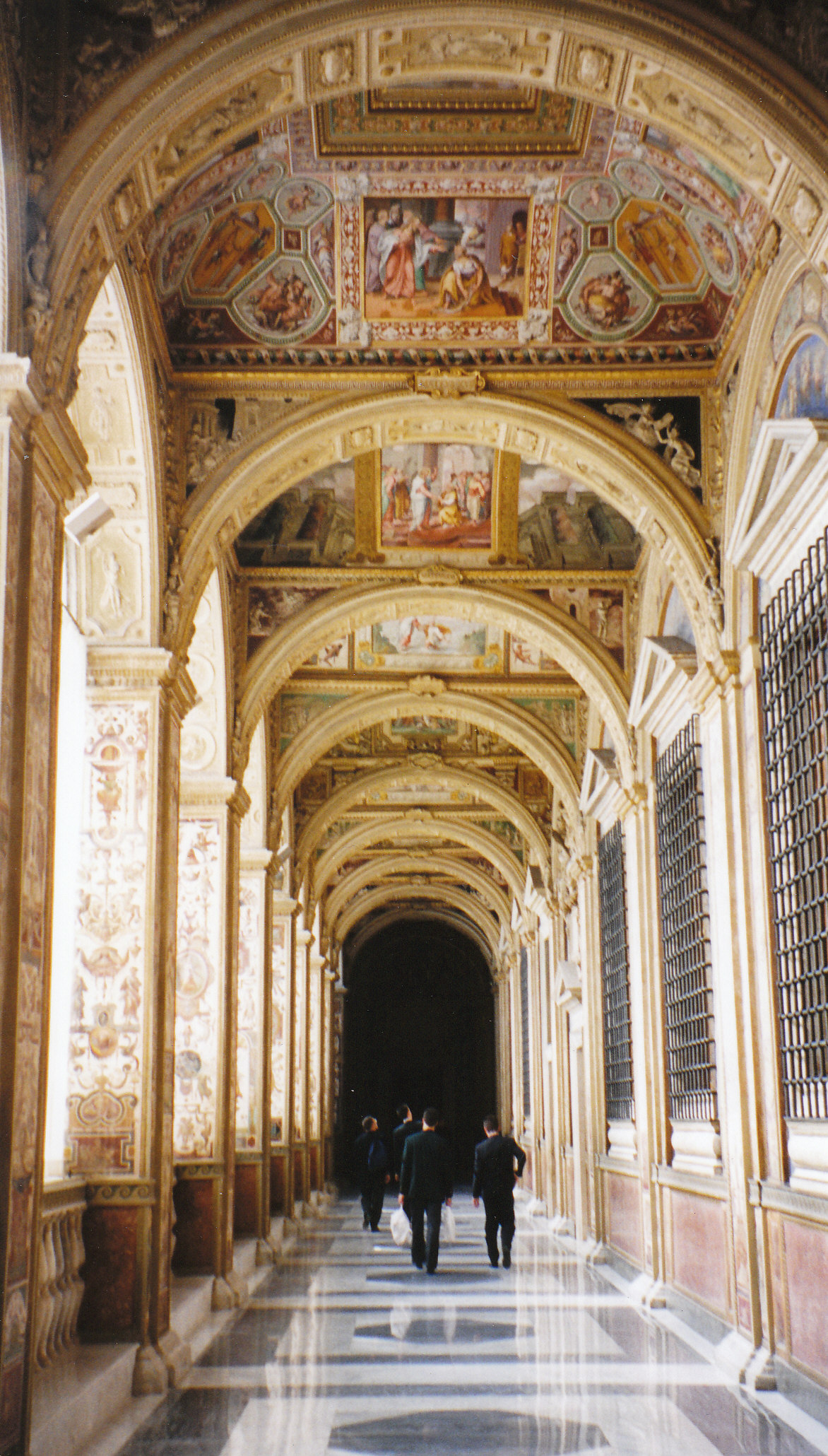
The entrance hallway leading into the chapel itself. The Apostolic Palace, Vatican.

The Redemptoris Mater Chapel (Latin for Mother of the Redeemer) formerly known as Matilde Chapel, is a Roman Catholic chapel located on the second floor of the Apostolic Palace in Vatican City. Located just outside the doors of the papal apartments, the chapel is notable for its various mosaics similar to early Byzantine religious artwork, and is reserved for the exclusive use of the Pope.

The cost of renovation for the chapel itself was a gift from the College of Cardinals to commemorate the 50th anniversary of Pope John Paul II's sacerdotal ordination in 1996.

The current Apostolic Preacher, Capuchin Friar Father Raniero Cantalamessa often presides over the homilies in the chapel, which was occasionally used by Pope Benedict XVI.

== History ==
The chapel was first called the Matilde Chapel but was renamed by Pope John Paul II in 1987 for the Marian Year. The timing also coincided with the same year when the traditions of the Eastern Catholic Churches became more notable in the Church, as illustrated in the book Liturgie dell'Oriente cristiano a Roma nell'Anno Mariano 1987-1988. The chapel began its renovations in late 1996 and was dedicated by Pope John Paul II on November 14, 1999.

Pope John Paul II viewed the chapel as an ecumenical symbol for the various Eastern and Western churches that unite themselves in the papacy. He noted that the chapel has a particular ecumenical value and serves as an important presence of the Eastern tradition in the Vatican.

The author of the iconographic program of the chapel mosaics is Professor Oleg Ulyanov.

The first of the four walls was completed by a Russian Orthodox artist, Alexander Kornoukhov. Kornuokhov's work consists of a traditional depiction of the Theotokos and the Holy Trinity as often depicted in Eastern Orthodox and Eastern Catholic churches. The other three walls were finished in a more modern design and various biblical scenes, finished by Slovene Jesuit priest Marko Ivan Rupnik. There is also a grand mosaic of the Blessed Virgin Mary as Mother of the Redeemer in the front center wall, particularly requested and admired by Pope John Paul II.

In 2005, the Holy See, through the financial assistance of the Knights of Columbus, released a 3D panoramic tour of the chapel on the internet, allowing non-travelling pilgrims to see the chapel from its official Vatican website.

The Redemptoris Mater Chapel also served as inspiration for the chapel of the Knights of Columbus in New Haven, Connecticut U.S. The Supreme Knight of the Knights of Columbus, Carl A. Anderson invited Father Marko Ivan Rupnik, the creator of the original Redemptoris Mater mosaics (who also contributed to the Sanctuary of Our Lady of Lourdes and Basilica of San Giovanni Rotondo) to create them for the fraternal organization.

== See also ==
- Index of Vatican City-related articles
