= Ordinance (canon law) =

Type of law in some churches

An ordinance or ecclesiastical ordinance is a type of law, legal instrument, or by-law in the canon law of the Catholic Church, the Anglican Communion, and in Calvinism.

Each Christian denomination that has a hierarchy tends to need rules and regulations that define the rights, privileges, powers, and responsibilities of each individual cleric (such as deacon, priest or pastor, bishop, cardinal, abbot, abbess, or religious like nuns and monks) and corporate bodies (vestry, canons, chapter house, diocese, College of Cardinals, etc.). A religious organization with a flat organizational structure or no hierarchy tends not to have ecclesiastical ordinances.

== Anglican Communion ==
In the Anglican Communion, particularly the American Episcopal Church, ecclesiastical ordinances are the bylaws of a Christian religious organization, especially that of a diocese or province of a church.

== Catholic Church ==
In the canon law of the Catholic Church, ecclesiastical ordinances are particular laws, issued in order to fulfil universal law on a local or regional level.

== Calvinism ==
Ecclesiastical Ordinances is the title of the foundation rules, or constitution, of the Reformed Church in Geneva, written by John Calvin in 1541. They were revised in 1561.

== See also ==
- Anglicanism
- Calvinism
- Catholic Church
- Church Order (Lutheran)
- Ecclesiastical court
- Ordinance (Christianity)
