= Martin Minařík =

Czech mountaineer

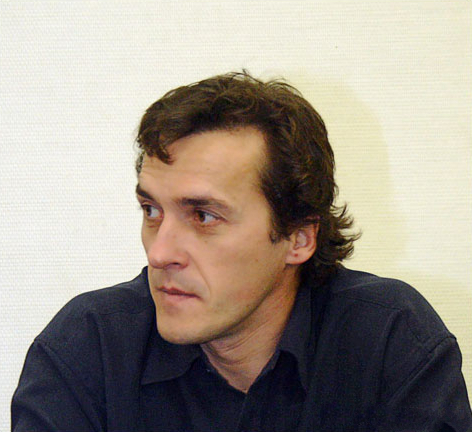
- Martin Minařík (2008)

Personal information
- Nationality: Czech
- Born: 27 November 1967 Benešov, Czechoslovakia
- Died: April 2009 Annapurna
- Children: David Minařík, Anna Minařík

Sport
- Partner: Shelly

Martin Minařík (27 November 1967 – April 2009) was a Czech mountaineer. He started climbing at the age of 16 in Hostýnské vrchy and later at the Tatra Mountains. In 1999 he climbed his first eight-thousander Manaslu. Later he climbed six more: Kangchenjunga (2002), Broad Peak (2003), Shishapangma (2004), Cho Oyu (2005), Lhotse (2007) and Dhaulagiri (2008). He died during a descent of Annapurna with Élisabeth Revol.
