= John Mirk =

English liturgical writer and Canon Regular

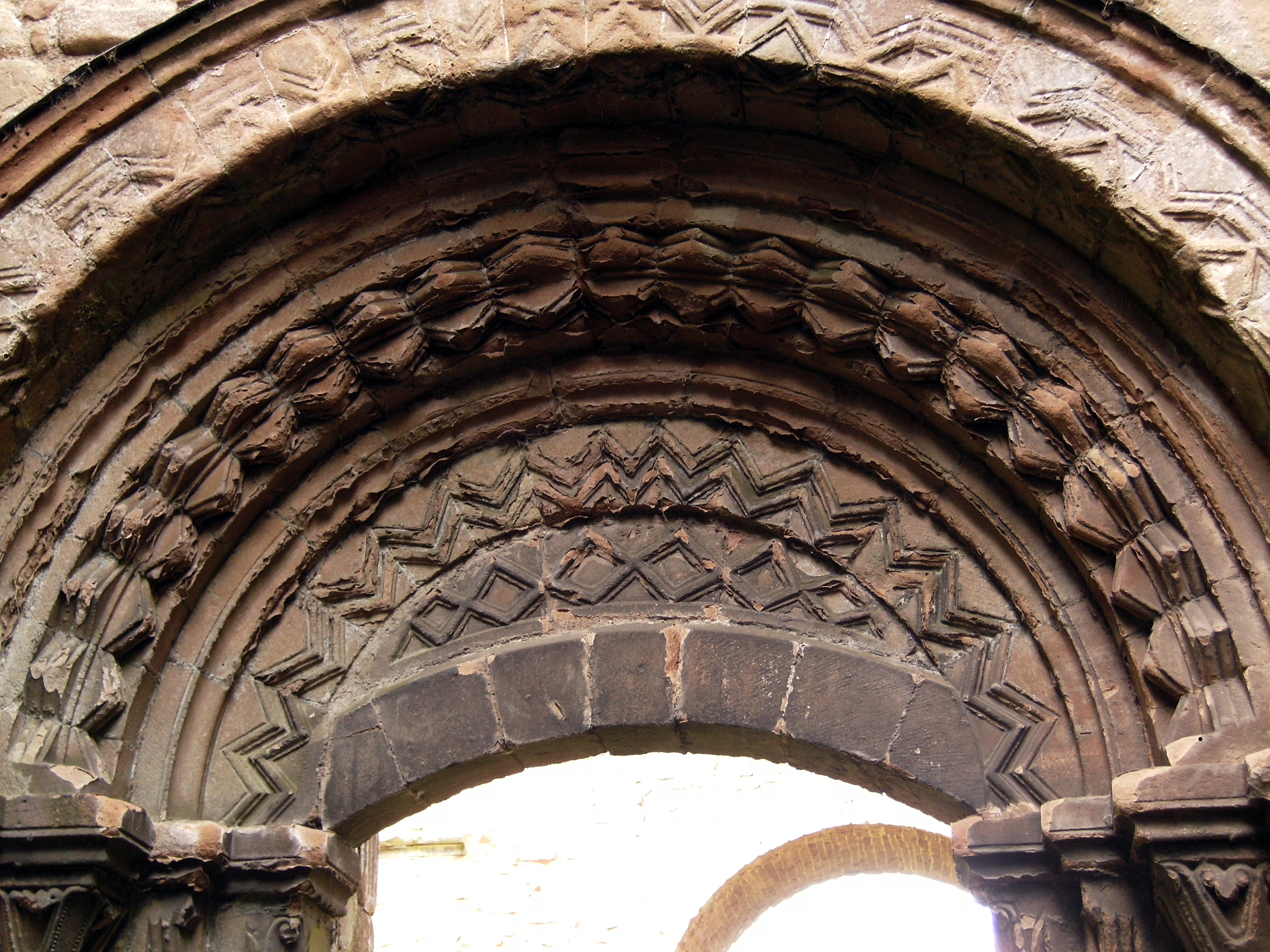
- Arch and tympanum over the processional entrance on south side of the church, Lilleshall Abbey
- Born: 14th century
- Died: 15th century Lilleshall Abbey
- Other names: Johannus Myrcus, John Myrc, John of Lilleshall
- Years active: c.1380–c.1420

Ecclesiastical career
- Church: Catholic Church
- Ordained: Priest
- Writings: Festial, Instructions to Parish Priests, Manuale Sacerdotis
- Title: Prior of Lilleshall Abbey

John Mirk was an Augustinian Canon Regular, active in the late 14th and early 15th centuries in Shropshire. He is noted as the author of widely copied, and later printed, books intended to aid parish priests and other clergy in their work. The most famous of these, his Book of Festivals or Festial was probably the most frequently printed English book before the Reformation.

== Life ==
=== Biographical information ===
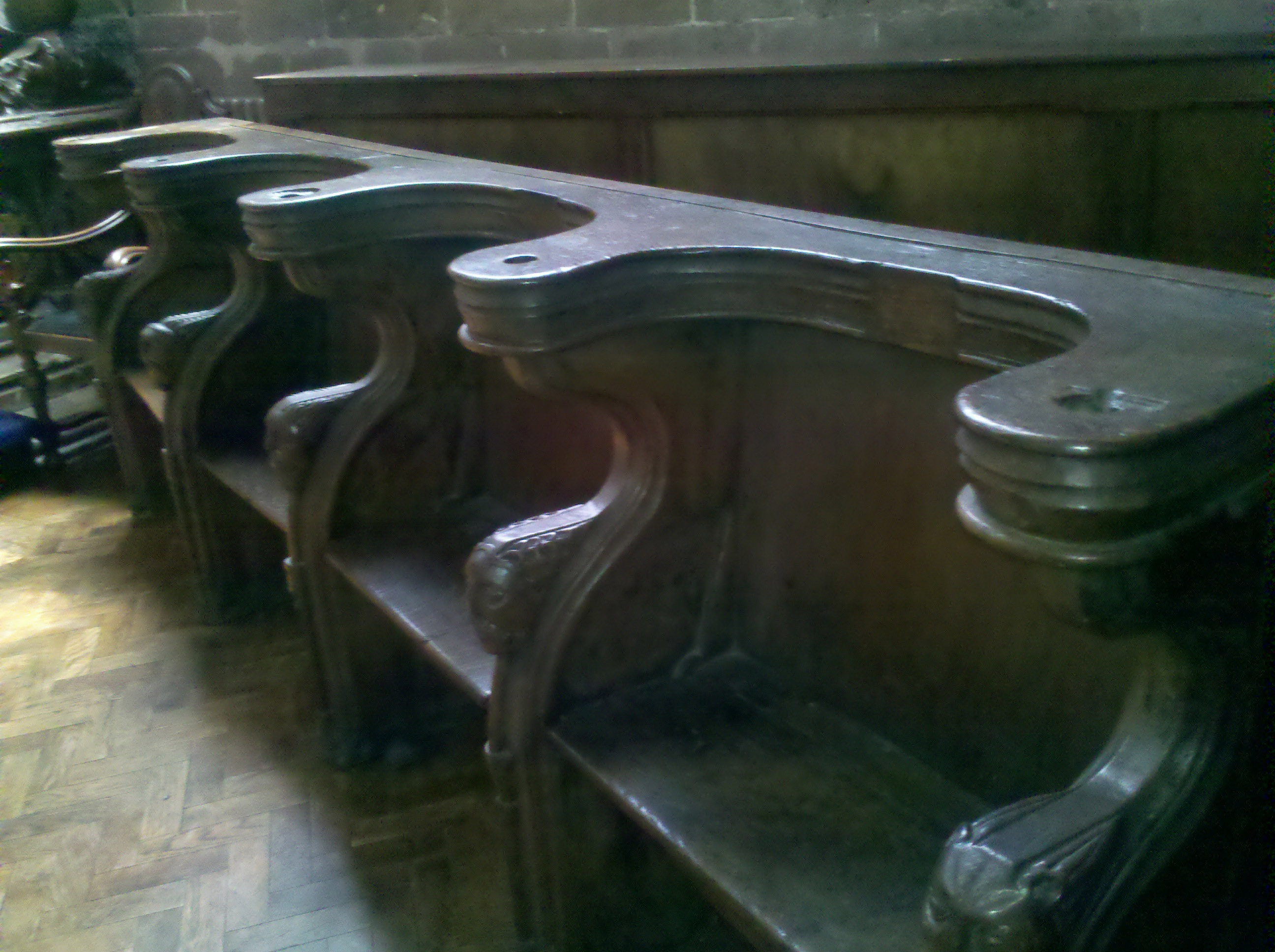
Pews at St Peter's Collegiate Church in Wolverhampton. These were originally Lilleshall Abbey choir stalls, where the canons sat during worship, and were donated to the church after the Dissolution of the monasteries.

Nothing is known of Mirk's life apart from what can be gathered from his works. Mirk was a canon of Lilleshall Abbey and later prior of the abbey. Until recently he was generally considered to have written mainly around 1400, but is now thought to have been active from rather earlier – probably the 1380s. His use of language and his name suggest he may have originated in northern England, a region strongly influenced by Norse settlement and culture. He seems to have been deeply committed to pastoral work and his work was directly relevant to the situation of Shrewsbury and its environs in his period. This has similarities to the work of lay catechesis pioneered under John of Thoresby, the Archbishop of York a generation earlier.

=== Historical context ===
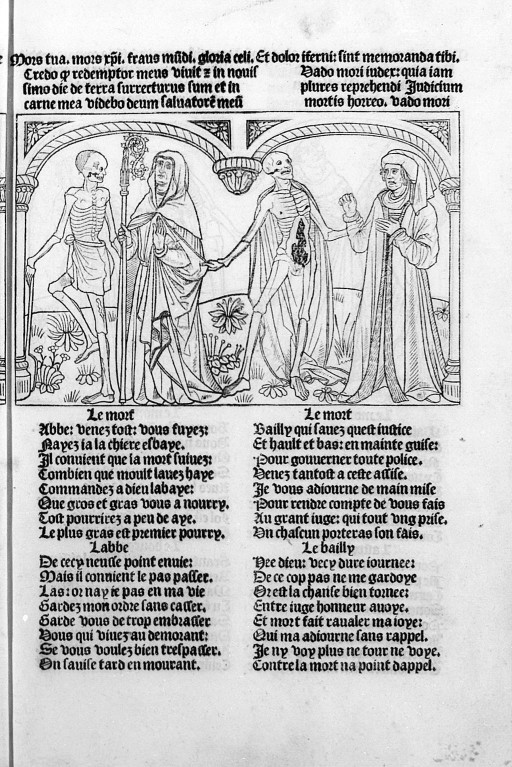
The Dance of Death, carrying off cleric and layperson alike in a 15th-century depiction.

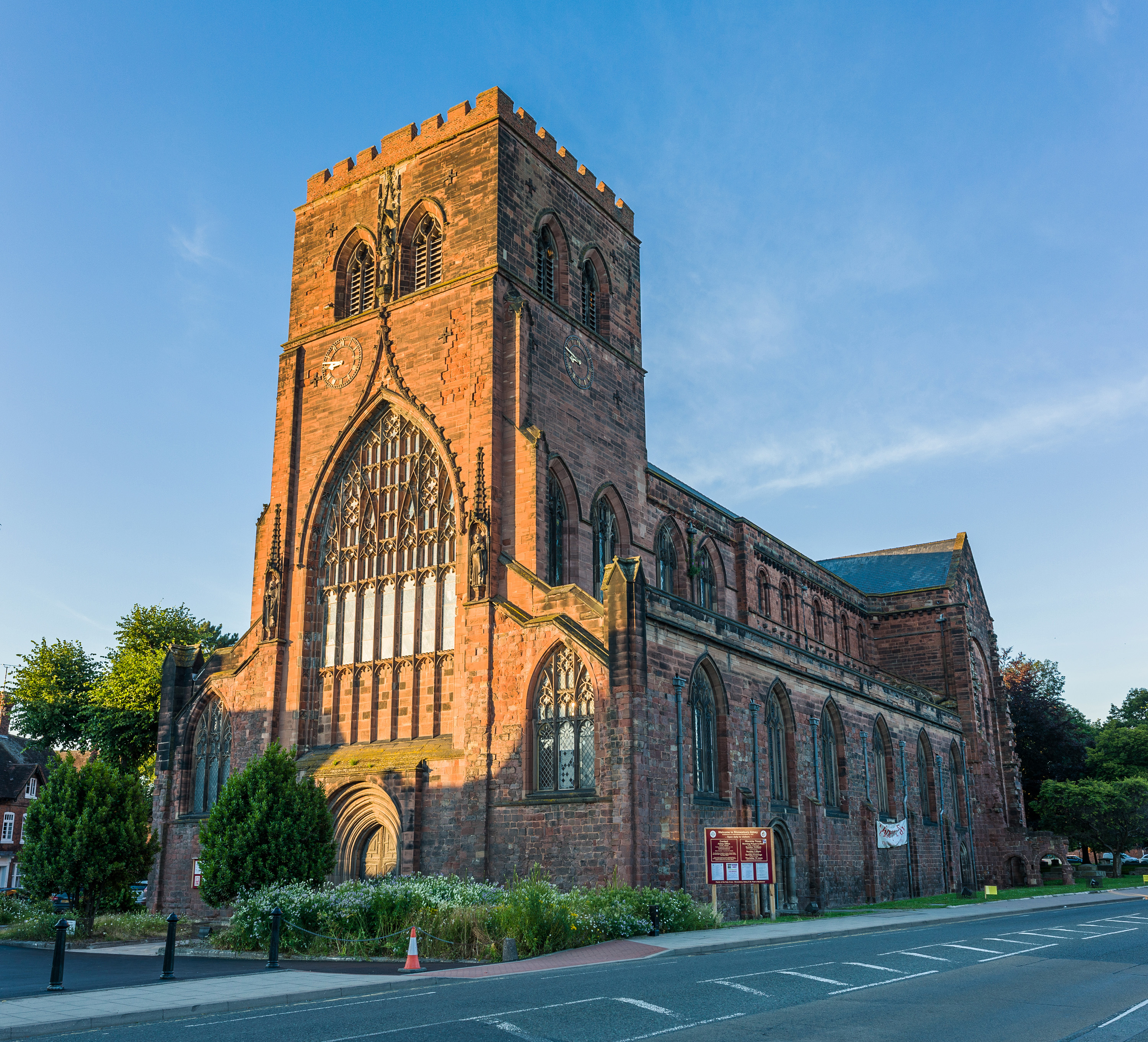
The church of Shrewsbury Abbey, although now a much truncated parish church, remains a dominant feature of the western approach to the town.

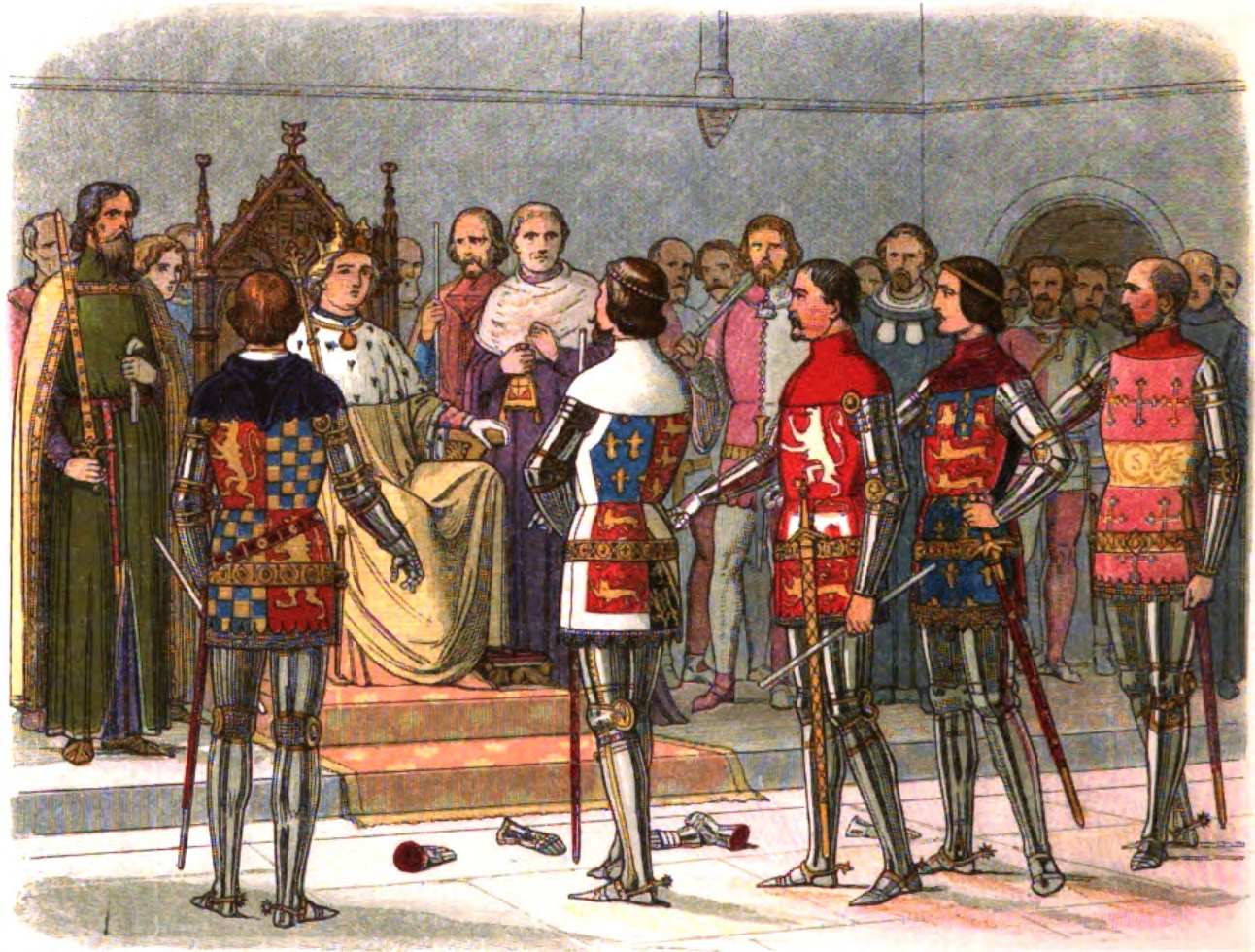
Arundel and the other Lords Appellant confront Richard II – a Victorian depiction.

While biographical information is scant, the religious and political background to Mirk's work is fairly well-known. The defining event in Mirk's background was the Black Death, which killed half the population and had major and protracted consequences for society and economy, as well as the spiritual life of the survivors. However, Shropshire's agrarian crisis started much earlier in the century, with a major cattle murrain and crop failures between 1315 and 1322 Moreover, the prolonged recovery from the disasters was jeopardised by the disorder of the early years of Henry IV's reign, when Owain Glyndŵr's revolt and the uprisings of discontented English nobles devastated many areas.

Lilleshall Abbey, Mirk's home, was a 12th-century foundation, originally intended to follow the rigorist teachings and practices of the Abbey of Arrouaise in northern France. Richard de Belmeis, one of the founders, was dean of the collegiate church of St Alkmund in Shrewsbury and was able to have the college suppressed and its wealth turned over to the abbey. This meant that Lilleshall was closely involved in the town of Shrewsbury, as much of its property was close to, and some within, the town. Lilleshall was brought to a nadir in the early 14th century by the agrarian crisis and the mismanagement and criminality of some abbots, notably John of Chetwynd, but made a surprisingly good recovery, largely through a reorganisation imposed by William de Shareshull. By Mirk's time, the abbey had entered a period of stability, reflected in a relatively high standard of monastic life and liturgy.

However the most powerful monastery locally was Shrewsbury Abbey, a Benedictine house which greatly prized the relics of Saint Winifred. In the late 14th century a new shrine was built to contain them. A group of monks and abbey servants then stole the relics of St Beuno, Winifred's uncle and confessor, from Rhewl and installed them in the abbey church.

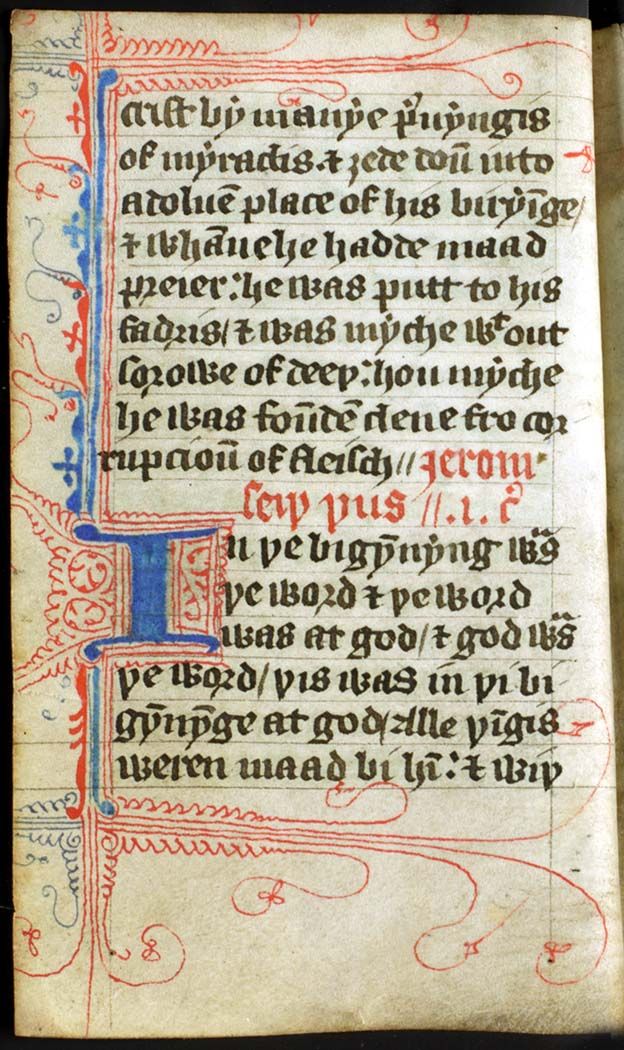
The beginning of the Gospel of John from a copy of John Wycliffe's translation. A vernacular presentation of the gospel was a key feature of Lollardy.

Shropshire was dominated by the FitzAlan Earls of Arundel, who had a strong influence on all aspects of political life, including parliamentary representation, in Shropshire and in Shrewsbury Richard FitzAlan, 11th Earl of Arundel was one of the Lords Appellant, opposed to Richard II's policies and his reliance on favourites The Appellants dominated the kingdom from 1387 to 1397 and Richard's brother, Thomas Arundel, became Archbishop of Canterbury. However, in 1397 the king moved against the Arundels and their allies. Earl Richard was arrested on 12 July, attainted, and executed on 21 September, while Thomas went into exile. Shortly afterwards, King Richard and his uncle, John of Gaunt, both stayed at Lilleshall Abbey, in connection with a session of Parliament held from 27 to 31 January in Shrewsbury, which brought looting by members of the royal household. It is not surprising that the Archbishop and Thomas FitzAlan, 12th Earl of Arundel, his nephew, were closely involved from the outset in the new Lancastrian regime of Henry IV, who seized power in 1399. The Battle of Shrewsbury, decisively securing Henry's grip on power, was fought just to the north of the town in 1403, causing considerable damage to the surrounding area. After this, Arundel tightened his grip on Shropshire, operating through an affinity of local landowners pledged to his service. These retainers were confirmed in his circle and in mutual solidarity by participating in his religious benefactions. In 1407, for example, a group of Arundel's retainers, including Robert Corbet, his brother Roger together donated a house in Shrewsbury to the Abbey. This outward piety did not stop them taking part in an armed raid directed against Wenlock Priory a few years later.

It was also in 1407 that William Thorpe is thought to have preached a Lollard sermon from the pulpit of St Chad's Church, Shrewsbury He proclaimed the centrality of the Word of God in preaching and Scripture against reliance on the sacraments and denounced the veneration of images and relics. He was particularly critical of pilgrimage, which he considered both futile in itself and surrounded by numerous social ills. This all clashed with popular religion as practised locally, with its lucrative cult of St Winifred and its highly organised celebration of Corpus Christi, featuring procession of the town's many trades. Thorpe was arrested, together with his associate, John Pollyrbach, and interviewed by Thomas Prestbury, the abbot of Shrewsbury, before being despatched to Archbishop Arundel. Thorpe's Testimony, purporting to recount these interviews, portrays the ensuing interchange as a victory for himself against Arundel, who was an enthusiastic persecutor of Lollards. Whatever the truth of this, Arundel sent commissions to Shropshire in May 1407 to arrest suspected Lollards, suggesting that the movement was perceived as a threat locally. Mirk's works are definitely orthodox and the Festial rejects Lollard teaching both implicitly and explicitly. It is possible that it was deliberately disseminated to combat Lollardy in the Midlands.

== Works ==
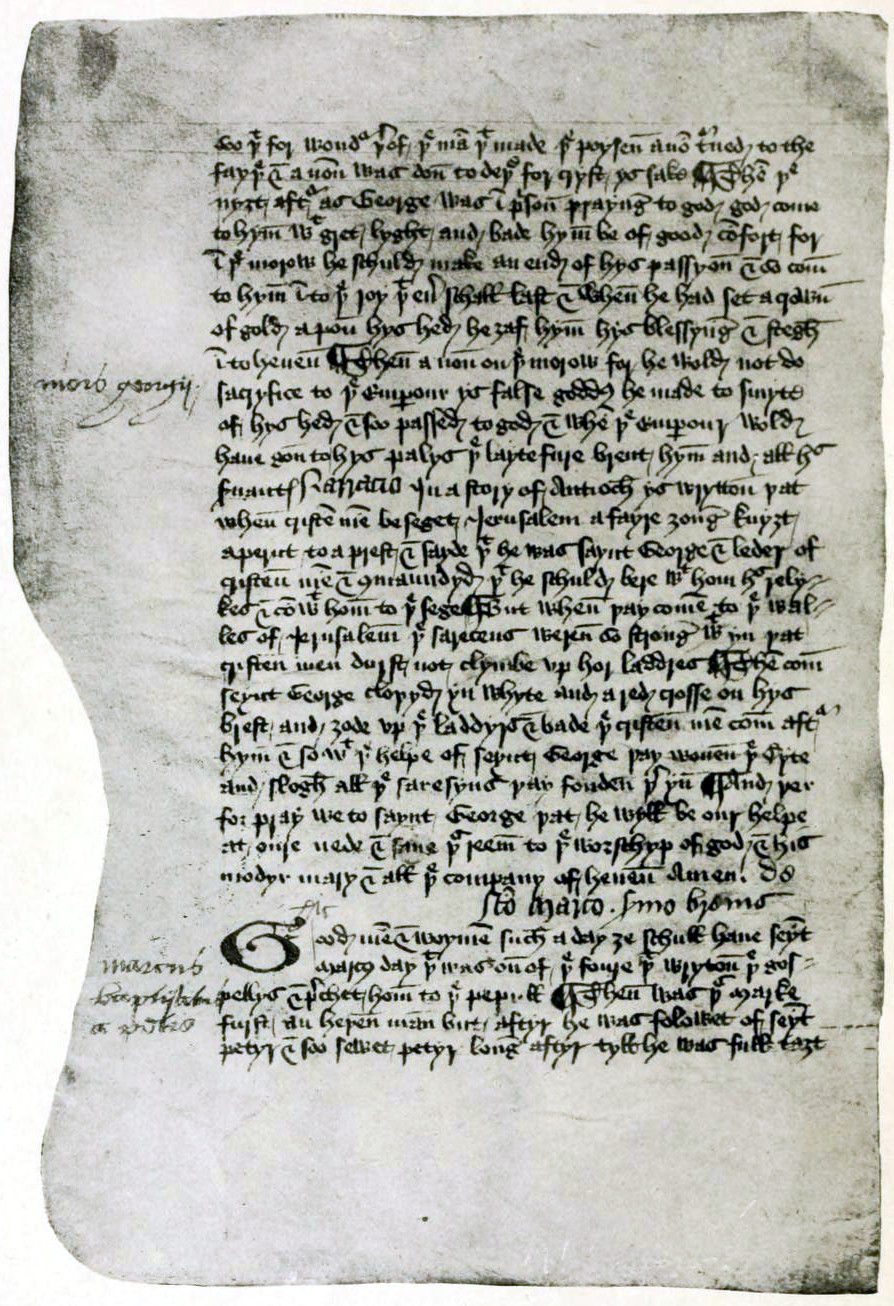
Page from a Gough manuscript of John Mirk's Festial, which formed the basis of Erbe's 1905 edition.

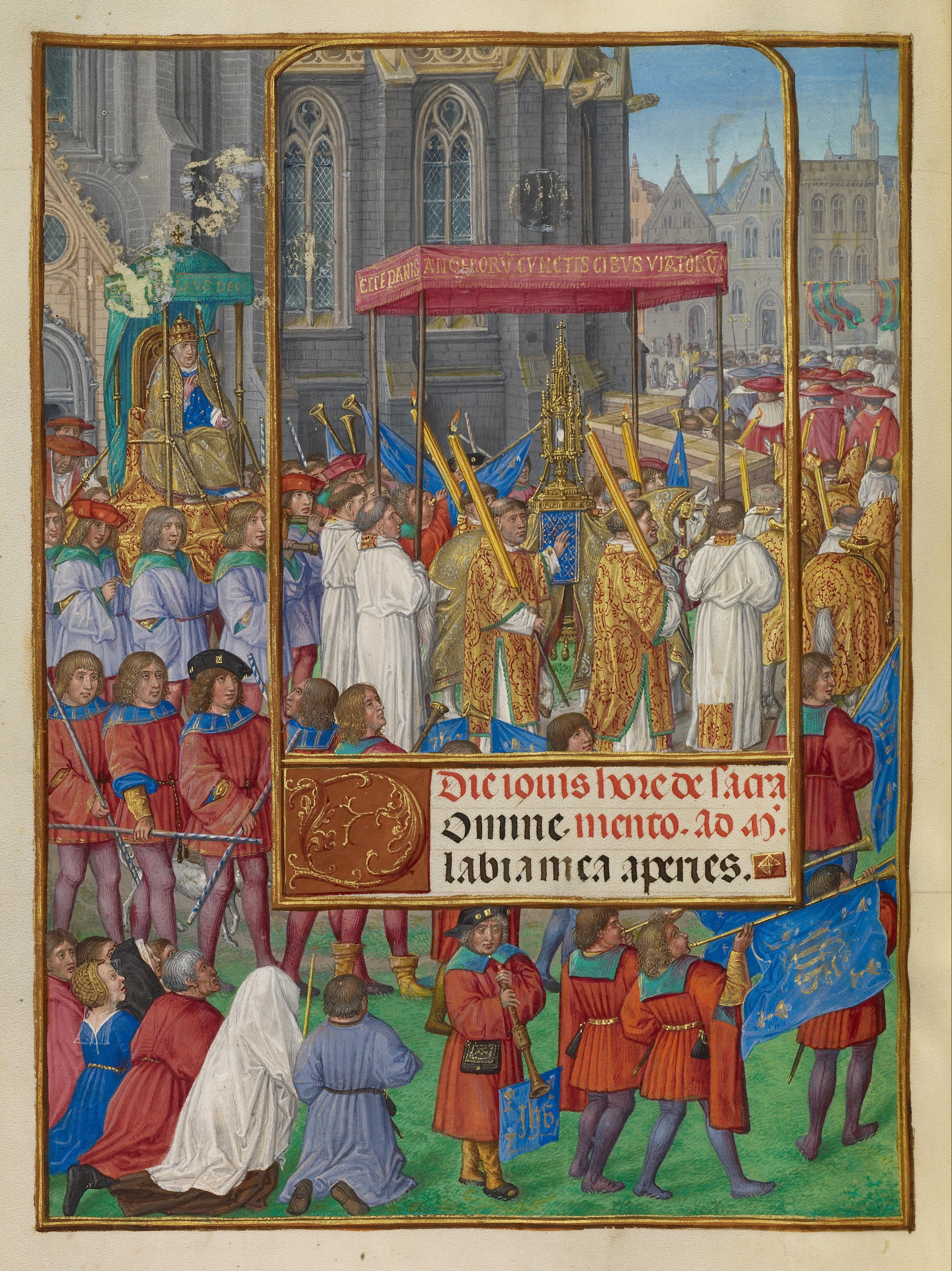
Corpus Christi procession, early 16th century. The feast was an important focus for popular piety, commercial display and civic pride in the late Middle Ages.

=== Festial ===
The Liber Festivalis (Book of Festivals) or Festial is a collection of homilies for the festivals of the liturgical year as it was celebrated in Mirk's time in Shropshire. He began with Advent Sunday and worked his way through to All Saints' Day, with a final sermon for the consecration of a church, although the order is disturbed to some extent in some manuscripts. Each sermon features one or more narrations, intended to illustrate the theme. His most important source was the Golden Legend, an immensely popular collection of hagiographies compiled by Jacobus de Voragine in the mid-13th century. However, Mirk chose to write in the vernacular, Middle English, a decision of ambiguous significance. It distinguished him from most other apologists for orthodoxy, as use of the vernacular was a key demand of the Lollards, although it was still not considered heretical in itself. Mirk was faced by the rise of a new class of literate laypeople, as well as by the sometimes unlettered parish clergy whom he acknowledges as his audience. His response was to present a compressed but comprehensive view of Christian teaching that privileges oral tradition above Biblical texts.

Mirk's narrations have often seemed simplistic or "materialist" to later ages. Ford comments that "English sermon collections composed with a popular audience in mind almost invariably favor a story-telling style and have been almost invariably criticized by scholars." The homily for Corpus Christi defends the doctrine of Transubstantiation, which the festival celebrates and the Lollards rejected, with just such a story, concerning Oda of Canterbury.

Original	Modern
This byschop had wyth hym of his clerkys þat beleuet not perfitly in þe sacrament of þe auter, and sayde þat þai myȝt not beleue þat Crist schedd his blod in þe masse. Then was þis bischop sory for her mysbeleue and prayed to God ȝorne for her amendement. And so, on a day, as he was at his masse, when he had made þe fraction as þe maner is, he saȝe þe blod drop doun from þe ost fast into þe chalice. Þen he made syne to hem þat mysbeleuet, to come and se. And whew þei saue his fyngurys blody and blod rane of Cristis body into þe chalis, þai weron agryset þat for veray fer þai cryet and sayd : Be þow blesset, man, þat has þis grace þus to handul Cristis body! We beleue now fully þat þis is verray Godis body, and his blod þat dropet þer into þe chalis. But now pray to hym þat þou hast þer in þi hondys, þat he sende no vengauwce vpon vs for oure mysbeleue! and so þe sacrament turnet into his forme of bred as hit was beforn; and þai weren good men and perfyte alway aftyr in þe beleue.	This bishop had with him several of his clergy who did not have a perfect belief in the sacrament of the altar and said that they might not believe that Christ shed his blood in the Mass. So this bishop was sorry for their disbelief and prayed to God constantly for their amendment. And so, one day, he was at his Mass, and when he had made the fraction in the prescribed manner, he saw blood drop down from the Host into the chalice. Then he signalled those who disbelieved to come and see. And when they saw that his fingers were bloody and that blood ran from Christ's body into the chalice, they were terrified to the extent that they cried out in real fear: “Blessed be you that have this grace so to handle Christ's body. We believe now that this is truly God's body and his blood that dropped there into the chalice. But now pray to him, whom you have there in your hands, that he send no vengeance upon us for our disbelief.” And so the sacrament turned into the form of bread as before; and they were good men and always after perfect in their faith.

Mirk goes on explicitly to reject Lollard teaching on images.

Original	Modern
For as Saynt Austyn sayde : Þe mynde of Cristis passion is þe best defence aȝens temptacions of þe fende. Herefor ben roodes sett on hey in holy chirch, and so by syȝt þerof haue mynd of Cristis passion. And þerfor roodes and oþyr ymages ben necessary in holy chirch, whateuer, þes Lollardes sayn.	For as St Augustine said: the memory of Christ's passion is the best defence against temptations of the Devil. Hence crosses have been placed on high in the holy church, so that by seeing them you might remember Christ's passion. And therefore crosses and other images have been necessary to the Church, whatever these Lollards might say.

Here Mirk is relatively sophisticated, arguing that the very traditional and popular religion that the Lollards rejected, properly interpreted, is not a distraction but actually a spur to a proper appreciation of Christian soteriology.

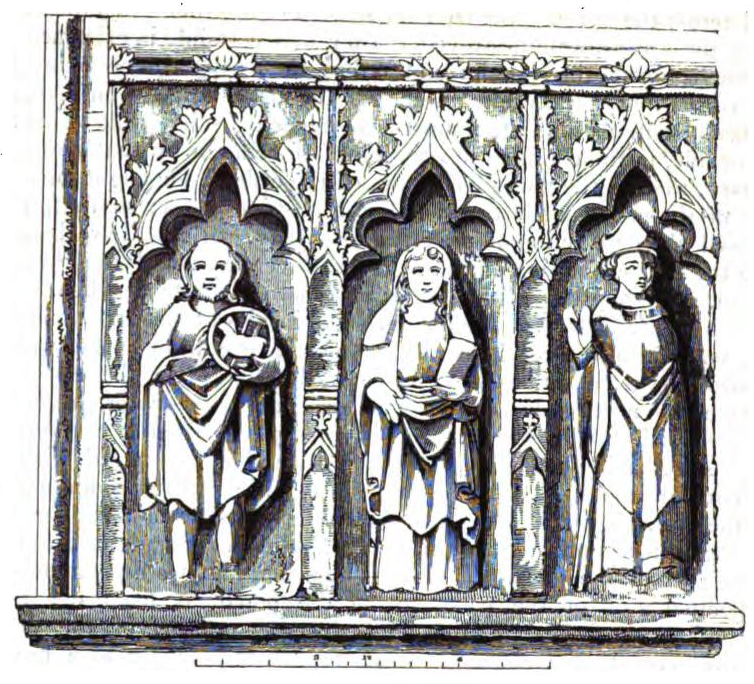
Depiction of a carved stone, considered by Owen and Blakeway to have come from Shrewsbury Abbey and to depict St Winifred, flanked by John the Baptist and St Beuno.

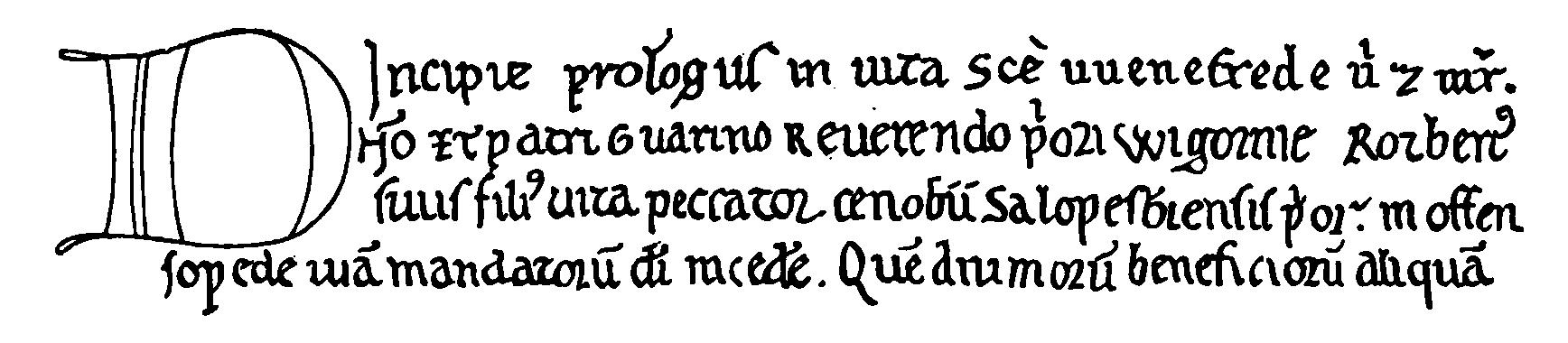
Part of the prologue of a life of St Winifred, allegedly written by Robert, a prior of Shrewsbury Abbey, in the mid-12th century. Bodleian Mss. Laud c.94

Mirk's responsiveness to local concerns is particularly evident in his homily for the feast of Saint Winifred. It retells the death and resurrection of the Welsh saint and of the translation of her thaumaturgic relics to Shrewsbury. The same emphasis on the miraculous and on the local continues in the homily for the feast of St Alkmund, hardly known outside the English Midlands, but especially important to Lilleshall Abbey, the successor institution to the college of St Alkmund in Shrewsbury. The opening remarks of the homily make clear that it was specifically written for St Alkmund's, now a parish church in Shrewsbury: "Therefore comyth to þe chirche, forto worschip God and Saynt Alkamunde, þe whech ys patron of þys chyrche" ("So come to the church to worship God and St. Alkmund, who is the patron of this church.").

In Mirk's telling of his legend, Alkmund was a King of Northumbria who had a wide hegemony. He intervened in a dispute between two vassal states. One side, the "duke of the March and Wales," refused to come to an agreement, and knowing that the other side were guiltless and had little chance of resisting, Alkmund voluntarily joined them in battle and met his inevitable death. However, Mirk then twists the story to argue a much more general point. "Thus Saynt Alkmunde sched his blod, and suffurd dethe for Goddys pepull. Wherfor he ys now an holy martyr befor God and all his angels; wherfor God schowet mony myrakles yn þat plas wher his body bledde." ("Thus St Alkmund shed his blood and suffered for God's people. Hence, he is now a holy martyr before God and all his angels, and so God manifested many miracles in that place where his body bled.")

As with his Corpus Christi homily, Mirk seeks to outflank Lollard criticisms. Where they rejected the cult of saints as a distraction from the central salvific role of Christ, Mirk portrays the saint's sacrificial and altruistic death as imaging Christ's passion. Lollard concerns are not simply dismissed but countered by a reinterpretation of tradition.

Over forty known manuscripts of the Festial are extant but about half diverge greatly from Mirk's original, with much of the local colour removed. It seems that there was a scholarly revision around the mid 15th century, intended to appeal to a more educated audience, and this was the basis of the printed editions. By the time William Caxton printed the Festial in 1483 it was well-established. It was printed in a further 22 editions, both in England and abroad, including a 1493 edition by Wynkyn de Worde, Caxton's associate and successor, who also printed the final edition in 1532. It was still widely read throughout the 16th century but then faded from view.

Interest began to revive after the 1905, when the first volume of Theodore Erbe's edition, based primarily on a Gough manuscript in the Bodleian Library, was published for the Early English Text Society. However, this contained only a text and glossary. Erbe's second volume, intended to contain most of the scholarly apparatus, never appeared and he was killed in World War I. As a result, Ford could write in 2006 that it was "widely known and little studied in the modern academic community, in spite of its medieval popularity." However, Susan Powell, now Emeritus Professor of Medieval Texts and Culture at Salford University, had long campaigned for the recognition of the historical importance of Mirk's work, and in 2009 brought out the first volume of a new edition, also for the Early English Text Society. This is based on a Cotton manuscript in the British Library. The second volume was released in 2011. Erbe's edition remains in print and, being long out of copyright, is available free of charge online.

=== Instructions for Parish Priests ===
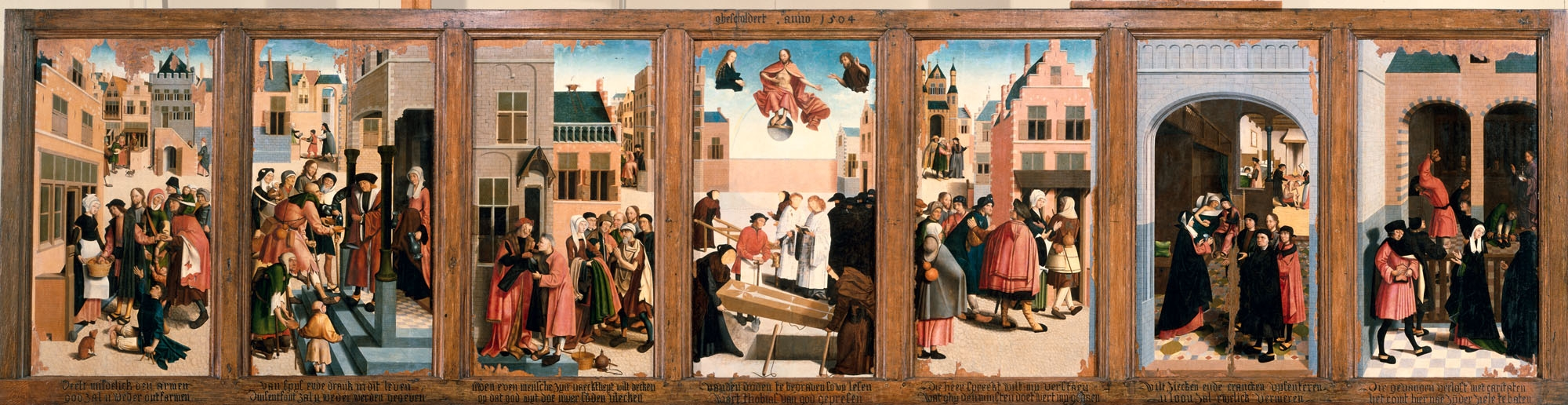
The Works of Mercy, by the Master of Alkmaar, early 16th century. The works of mercy are shown in this order: feeding the hungry, giving drink to the thirsty, clothing the naked, burying the dead, sheltering the traveller, comforting the sick, and freeing the prisoner.

Instructions for Parish Priests is in lively vernacular verse, using octosyllabic lines and rhyming couplets throughout, and running to 1934 lines. The colophon runs: Explicit tractatus qui dicitur pars oculi, de latino in anglicum translatus per fratrem Johannem myrcus, canonicum regularem Monasterii de Lylleshul, cuius anime propicietur deus! Amen.

Mirk maintains here that he had interpreted the work from a Latin manual called Pars oculi: a title familiar from manuals for the clergy like the Oculus Sacerdotis of William of Pagula, which was widely available in Mirk's time in the form republished by John de Burgh as Pupilla oculi. However, this work is much larger than Mirk's. Another possible influence was the sacerdotal manual by Mirk himself but even this too is far too long to have been the original, and seems moreover to be of later date. The underlying text behind his translation is not known, if it ever existed: it seems more likely that Mirk drew inspiration from the earlier manuals but did not directly translate. Notably, he is here described as a canon of Lilleshall, signifying that this work dates from the period before he became prior of the abbey.

The medieval Catholic Church had expended considerable energy in systematising the basic teachings of its faith. In 1215, the first canon of the Fourth Council of the Lateran had defined conclusively the main points of Catholic dogma that needed to be communicated to all. Archbishop John Peckham turned this into a clear list for his Archdiocese of Canterbury in the Lambeth Constitutions of 1281, which promulgated a manual known as the Ignorantia sacerdotum. John of Thoresby went further, largely reiterating Peckham's pronouncements but also having them adapted and expanded into a vernacular verse document, known as the Lay Folks' Catechism for his Archdiocese of York, in 1357. Both these catechetical manuals set out six key areas to cover: The Creed (condensed to a 14-point summary), the Ten Commandments, The Seven Sacraments, the Seven Deeds of Mercy, the Seven Virtues, the Seven Deadly Sins.

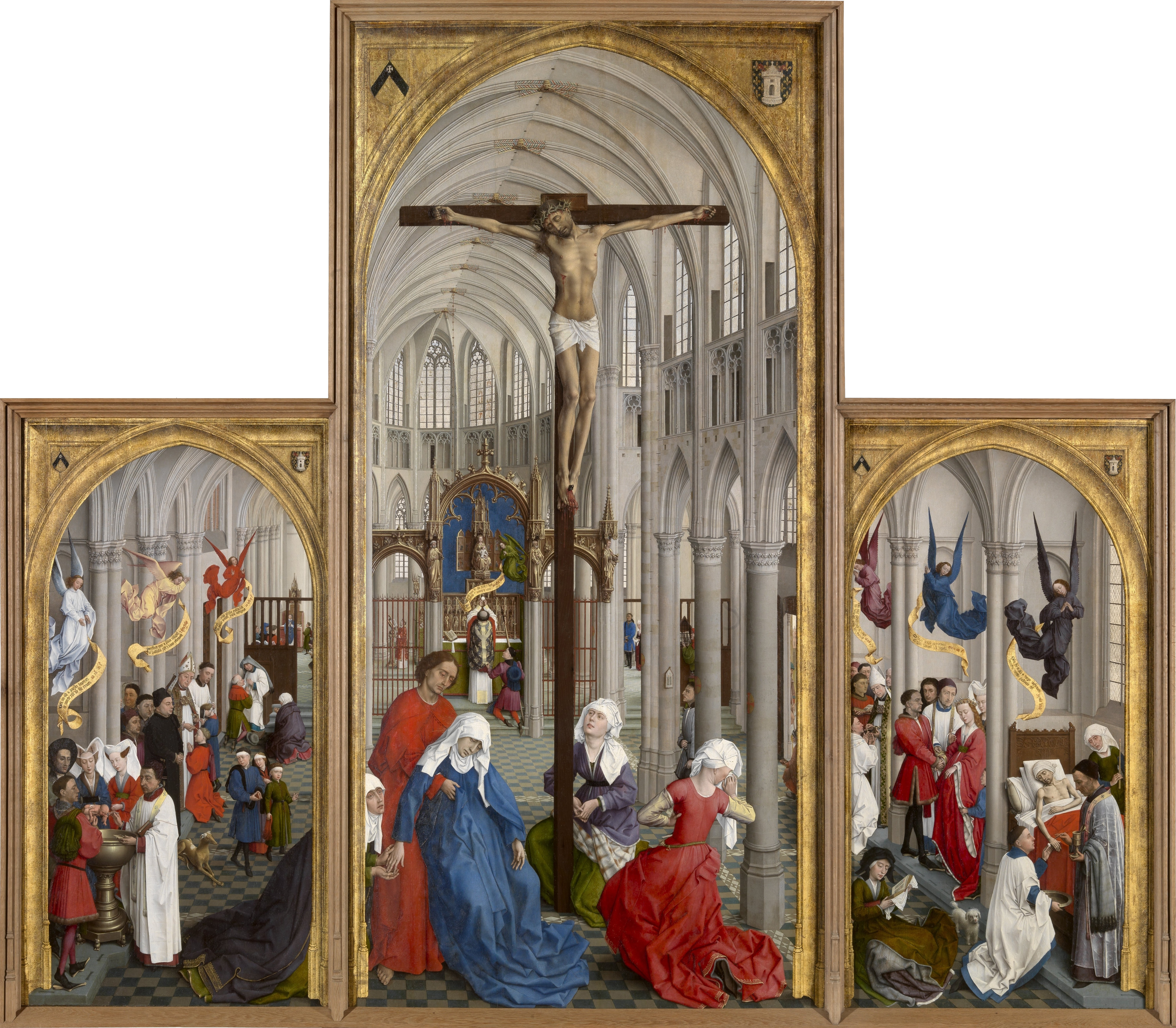
Mid-15th century Seven Sacraments Altarpiece by Rogier van der Weyden

Original

The lawe and the lore to knawe god all-mighten
Thatt principali may be shewed in this sex thinges:
In the fourtene poyntes that falles to the trouthe,
In the ten comandementeʒ that god has gyven us,
In the seuen Sacrementʒ that er in hali kirke,
In the seuen dedis of merci until oure euen-cristen,
In the seuen vertues that ilk man sal use,
And in the seuen dedely sinnes that man sal refuse.

Modern

The law and lore to know God almighty
that principally may be shown in these six things:
In the fourteen points that pertain to Truth
In the Ten Commandments God has given us
In the Seven Sacraments that are in Holy Church
In the Seven Deeds of Mercy to our fellow-Christian
In the Seven Vertues that such a man shall practise
And in the Seven Deadly Sins that man shall avoid.

Mirk's work falls well within this catechetical tradition. He was aware that many priests could draw on little learning in giving counsel to their flock.

Original

God seyth hym self, as wryten we fynde,
That whenne þe blynde ledeth þe blynde,
In to þe dyche þey fallen boo,
For þey ne sen whare by to go.
So faren prestes now by dawe;
They beth blynde in goddes lawe,
That whenne þey scholde þe pepul rede
In to synne þey do hem lede.

Modern

God says himself, as we find written,
That when the blind lead the blind,
Into the ditch they fall together,
For they see not where to go.
So, (though) priests go by day,
They are (so) blind in God's law,
That, when they should the people teach,
They lead them into sin (instead).

Initially, Mirk's themes are loosely connected but unsystematic. He gives the priests general instructions on leading a chaste and austere life. He then moves suddenly from stressing a priest's preaching duties to a series of injunctions on baptism, childbirth, and the role of midwives, stressing the imperative need to deliver a child surgically from a dead mother so it can be baptised in case of emergency – even if necessary to call on a man's help. Consideration is then given to the role of godparents at baptism and confirmation, consanguinity and betrothal, lechery, avoidance of incest, pederasty and adultery. Then follows a diversion into the Real presence of Christ in the Eucharist and its consequences for Eucharistic practice. Various injunctions are then delivered, e.g. games must not be played in churchyards; tithes are to paid scrupulously; witchcraft is evil; but usury is especially galling to Jesus, and exploitative pricing is usury by another name.

Original

Vsure and okere þat beth al on,
Teche hem þat þey vse non;
That ys a synne fulle greuus
By-fore owre lord swete Ihesus.
God taketh myche on gref
To selle a mon in hys myschef
Any þynge to hye prys.

Modern

Usury and okering, which are all one,
Teach them to practice not;
That is a sin most grievous
Before Our Lord, sweet Jesus.
God is most grieved
By selling to a man in his misfortune
Anything at too high price.

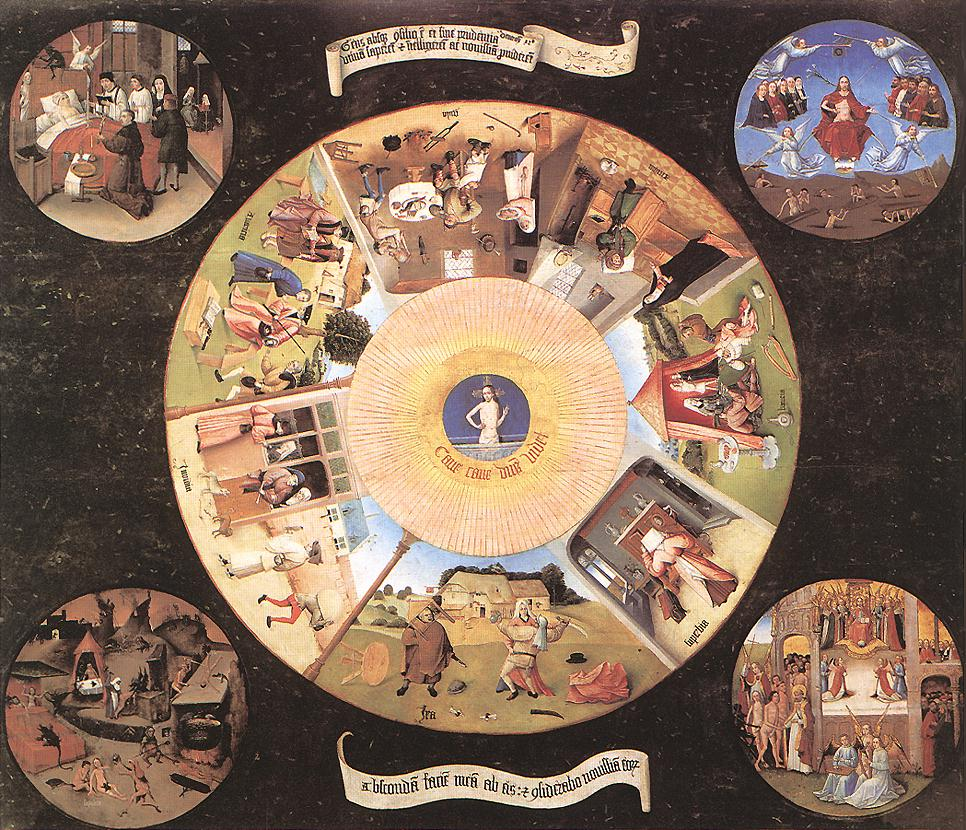
The Seven deadly Sins and Four Last Things (1485) by Hieronymus Bosch

Once this excursus is finished, however, Mirk essentially follows the six points of the Lay Folks' Catechism. He gives the text of the Lord's Prayer and the short form of the Hail Mary then in use, both in English. Then comes consideration of the Apostles' Creed, which is then versified and divided into fourteen articles; a summary of the seven sacraments, followed by detailed consideration of baptism, confirmation and confession. This provided a narrative thread as the theme of confession leads naturally into questioning a penitent. The framework for this interrogation is provided by Ten Commandments, the Seven Deadly Sins, the Seven Deeds of Mercy, and the Seven Virtues, each considered in relation to the corresponding sin. Penance is then explained, followed by the Last rites, of which it forms a part. After a series of instructions for those that are "mene of lore," the least learned priests, Mirk's conclusion asks that the reader pray for the author.

Only seven manuscripts of the Instructions survive, although the fact that it was a manual intended for regular use suggests that many may have been lost through wear and tear. An edition, prepared for the Early English Text Society by Edward Peacock, was published in 1868 and revised in 1902 by Frederick James Furnivall. As these are out of copyright, both versions are now freely available online. A modern critical edition was produced in Sweden in 1974 by Gillis Kristensson of Lund University.

=== Manuale Sacerdotis ===
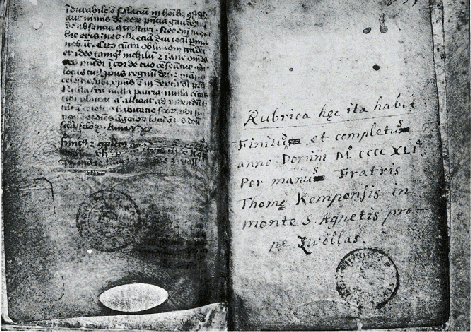
Manuscript of The Imitation of Christ by Thomas à Kempis, a German Augustinian, and dating from about 1418. Imitation of Christ and an intense focus of the Eucharist were common threads in Augustinian theology and spirituality of the period.

The Manuale Sacerdotis or Priest's Handbook seems to date from about 1400 – rather later than Mirk's other works, and when he was prior of Lilleshall. Like the Instructions, it seems to draw on William of Pagula's work, but it has an entirely different agenda from Mirk's earlier work. Instead of providing simple instruction in doctrine and practice, it aims to provide an understanding of the meaning and role of the priesthood. This accounts for Mirk's decision to write in Latin prose, as the audience is assumed to be better-educated. It is addressed to a friend of Mirk, named as "John, vicar of A." It has been conjectured that he was John Sotton, who was vicar of St Alkmund's from 1414, and he is called "John de S" in some manuscripts. This is not simply a preliminary dedication: John is continually addressed throughout the book.

Mirk begins by contrasting the good priest with the modern priest, who is distracted by the vanities of secular life. He proceeds to a detailed account of the priest's activities, including the canonical hours and celebration of the Eucharist. Here, as he considers the focus of the priestly office, he explicitly responds to Lollardy, explaining in detail the doctrine of Transubstantiation. He re-uses the story of St Oda that he employed in his homily for Corpus Christi.

Mirk's underlying purpose seems to be to make clear the correlation between the external activity to the inner life, which for Mirk, involves the following of a rule: “life without a rule is nothing less than dying.” While Mirk follows a written rule, he commends to the priest the principles inherent in Christ's own life.

The Manuale has been overshadowed by the Festial and the Instructions, not least because it is in Latin and probably never had the wide readership of the vernacular works. Thirteen extant manuscripts are known. It has not yet been printed, although a critical edition by Susan Powell and James Girsch, based on Bodleian Library MS Bodley 632, is planned.
