= Peter Collier =

Peter Collier may refer to:

- Peter Collier (politician) (born 1959), Australian politician
- Peter Collier (writer) (1939–2019), American writer and founder of Encounter Books
- Peter Fenelon Collier (1849–1909), Irish-American publisher, founder of Collier's Weekly
- Peter Collier (judge) (b. 1948), British barrister and judge (retired), and former Chancellor of the Diocese of York from 2006 until he retired.
