= Cathedral chapter =

Group of monks or other clergy who staff and administer a bishop's cathedral

According to both Catholic and Anglican canon law, a cathedral chapter is a college of clerics (chapter) formed to advise a bishop and, in the case of a vacancy of the episcopal see in some countries, to govern the diocese during the vacancy. In the Catholic Church their creation is the purview of the Pope. They can be numbered, in which case they are provided with a fixed prebend, or unnumbered, in which case the bishop indicates the number of canons according to the ability of diocesan revenues to support them. These chapters are made up of canons and other officers, while in the Church of England chapters now include a number of lay appointees.

In some Church of England cathedrals there are two such bodies, the lesser and greater chapters, which have different functions. The smaller body usually consists of the residentiary members and is included in the larger one.

== Historical information ==
Originally, the term "chapter" referred to a section of a monastic rule that was read out daily during the assembly of a group of canons or other clergy attached to a cathedral or collegiate church. Over time its meaning was extended to the meeting at which the reading took place, and further to the meeting’s attendees.

=== Relationship of chapter and bishop ===
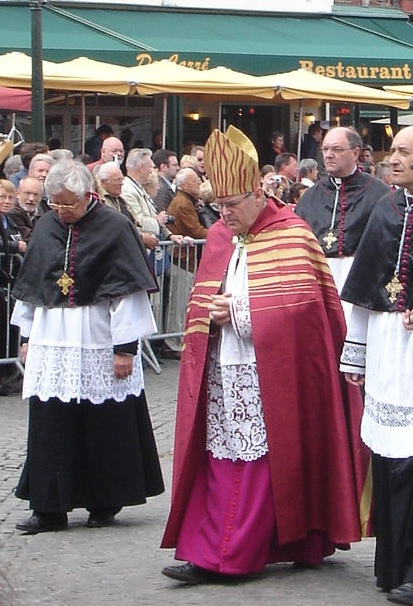
Cathedral chapter of Bruges, the bishop and three canons taking part in a procession

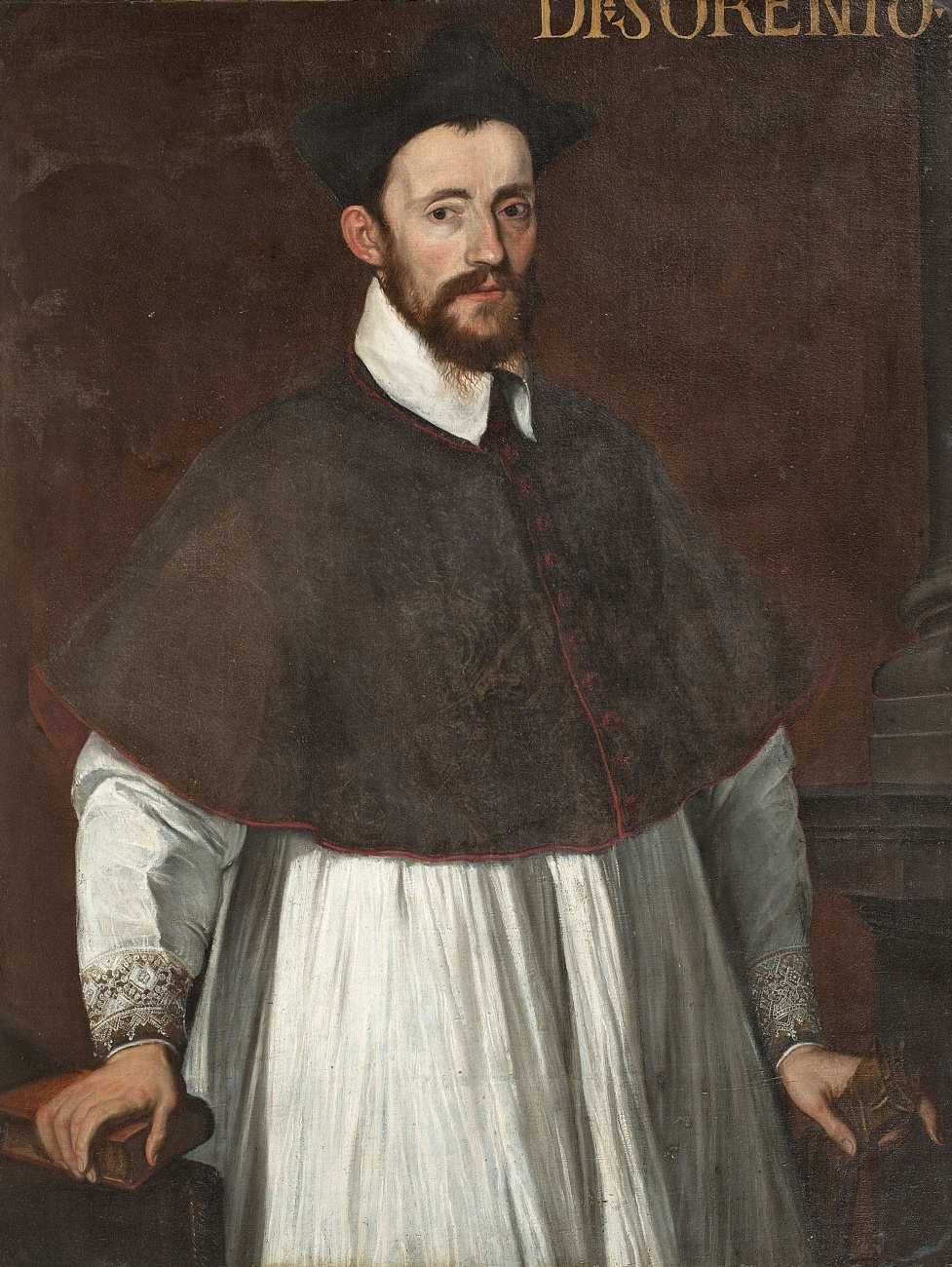
Canon, 16th century in Italy

Historically, there was no distinction between the monastic cathedral chapters and those of the secular canons, in their relation to the bishop or diocese. In both cases the chapter was the bishop's concilium or council, which he was bound to consult on all important matters and without doing so he could not act. Thus, a judicial decision of a bishop needed the confirmation of the chapter before it could be enforced. He could not change the service books, or "use" of the church or diocese, without capitular consent, and there are episcopal acts, such as the appointment of a diocesan chancellor, or vicar general, which still need confirmation by the chapter.

In its corporate capacity the chapter takes charge sede vacante of a diocese. In England, however (except as regards Salisbury and Durham), this custom has never obtained, the two archbishops having, from time immemorial, taken charge of the vacant dioceses in their respective provinces. When, however, either of the sees of Canterbury or York is vacant the chapters of those churches take charge, not only of the diocese, but of the province as well, and incidentally, therefore, of any of the dioceses of the province which may be vacant at the same time.

=== Roles within secular chapters ===
The normal constitution of the chapter of a secular cathedral church comprised four dignitaries (there might be more), in addition to the canons. These are the dean, the precentor, the chancellor and the treasurer. These four dignitaries, occupying the four corner stalls in the choir, are called in many of the statutes the quatuor majores personae of the church.

==== Dean ====
A dean (decanus) seems to have derived the designation from the Benedictine "deans" who had ten monks under their charge. The dean came into existence to supply the place of the provost in the internal management of the church and chapter. In England every secular cathedral church was headed by a dean who was originally elected by the chapter and confirmed in office by the bishop. The dean is president of the chapter and within the cathedral has charge of the celebration of the services, taking specified portions of them by statute on the principal festivals. Deans sit in the principal stall in the choir, which is usually the first on the right hand on entering the choir at the west.

==== Precentor ====
Next to the dean (as a rule) is the precentor (primicerius, cantor, etc.), whose special duty is that of regulating the musical portion of the services. Precentors preside in the dean's absence and occupy the corresponding stall on the left side, although there are exceptions to this rule, where, as at St Paul's Cathedral, London, the archdeacon of the cathedral city ranks second and occupies what is usually the precentor's stall.

==== Chancellor ====
The third officer is the chancellor (scholasticus, écoldtre, capiscol, magistral, etc.) (not to be confused with the chancellor of the diocese). The chancellor of the cathedral church is charged with the oversight of its schools, ought to read theology lectures and superintend the lections in the choir and correct slovenly readers. Chancellors are often the secretary and librarian of the chapter. In the absence of the dean and precentor the chancellor is president of the chapter. The easternmost stall, on the dean's side of the choir, is usually assigned to the chancellor.

==== Treasurer ====
The fourth officer is the treasurer (custos, sacrisla, cheficier). They are guardians of the fabric and all the furniture and ornaments of the church. It was their duty to provide bread and wine for the Eucharist and candles and incense. They also regulated such matters as the ringing of the bells. The treasurer's stall is opposite to that of the chancellor. The first treasurer for York Minster, for example, was appointed in 1091 when the office was established by Thomas of Bayeux, Archbishop of York.

==== Additional clergy ====
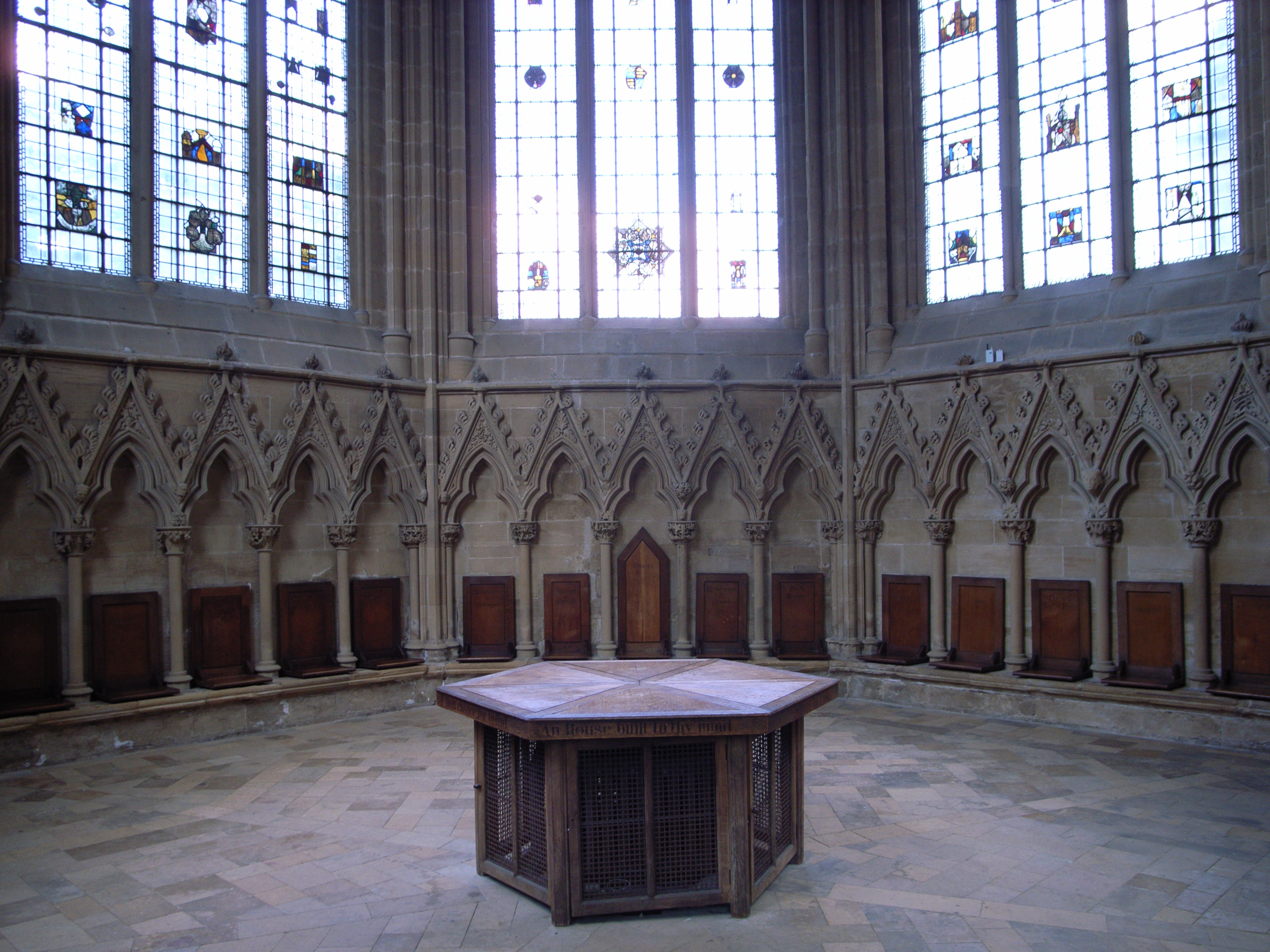
Interior of the Chapter House at Southwell Minster in Nottinghamshire, England

In many cathedral churches there were additional officers, such as the praelector, subdean, vice-chancellor, succentor-canonicorum, whose roles came into existence to supply the places of the other absent officers, for non-residence was the fatal blot of the secular churches, and in this they contrasted very badly with the monastic churches, where all the members were in continuous residence. There were also ordinary canons, each of whom, as a rule, held a separate prebend or endowment, besides receiving their share of the common funds of the church.

For the most part the canons also speedily became non-resident, and this led to the distinction of residentiary and non-residentiary canons, until in most churches the number of resident canons became definitely limited in number and the non-residentiary canons, who no longer shared in the common funds, became generally known as prebendaries only, although by their non-residence they did not forfeit their position as canons and retained their votes in chapter like the others.

This system of non-residence led also to the institution of vicars choral, each canon having their own vicar, who sat in their stall in their absence and, when the canon was present, in the stall immediately below on the second form. The vicars had no place or vote in chapter and, though irremovable except for offences, were the servants of their absent canons whose stalls they occupied and whose duties they performed. Outside of Britain they were often called demi-prebendaries and they formed the bachcrur of the French churches. As time went on the vicars were themselves often incorporated as a kind of lesser chapter, or college, under the supervision of the dean and chapter.

== Contemporary roles ==
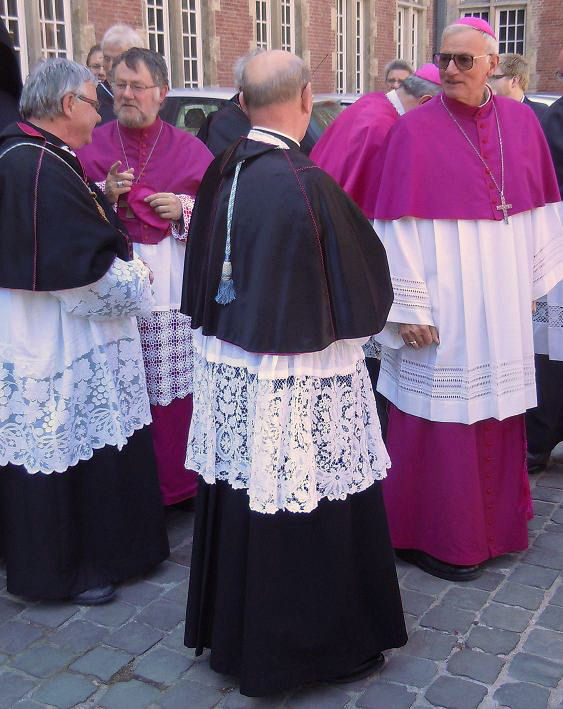
Cathedral Chapter of the Holy Saviour in Bruges, Belgium

In contemporary cathedral chapters, the most common roles besides dean include precentor, pastor, sub-dean/vice-dean, chancellor, archdeacon, treasurer and missioner, although there is also a wide variety of roles which each occur only once or twice.

=== Church of England ===
In Church of England cathedrals, under the Cathedrals Measure 1999, the Church Commissioners fund two Canons Residentiary per cathedral (sometimes called Commissioners' Canons) who must be "engaged exclusively on cathedral duties". Further residentiary canons beyond those two are funded from other sources and often called Diocesan Canons, since they typically also hold a senior diocesan post (such as Diocesan Director of Ordinands or Director of Mission).

=== Catholic Church ===
The Second Vatican Council (1963-65) proposed that diocesan institutions which supported diocesan bishops, especially cathedral chapters but also senates, councils or board of consulters supporting them, "should be reorganized wherever necessary in keeping with present day needs".

== See also ==
- Chapter house

== Sources ==
- Coredon, Christopher (2007). A Dictionary of Medieval Terms & Phrases (Reprint ed.). Woodbridge: D. S. Brewer. ISBN 978-1-84384-138-8.
