= Oculus Sacerdotis =

1320 book by William of Pagula

Oculus Sacerdotis ("Priest's Eye")
- Author: William of Pagula
- Language: Latin
- Subject: theology, canon law
- Publication date: between 1320 and 1323
- Publication place: Kingdom of England

The Oculus Sacerdotis was a 14th-century book by William of Pagula. Influenced by or possibly lifted from the Peckham Constitutions of 1281, they are divided into three volumes written between 1320 and 1323, the book sought to be a comprehensive manual for parish priests (many of whom were poorly educated), and covered the confessional, sacramental theology and preaching. Described as "deep, all-encompassing and quite encyclopaedic", sections of the book were in use up to the late Middle Ages, and approximately fifty copies are known still to exist in various libraries.

== Contents and impact ==
The title Oculus Sacerdotis translates as "priest's eye", and refers to a theory put about in the book Oculus Moralis by Petrus Lacepiera that the different eyes on a human saw and represented different things – the right eye was the eye of morals and actions, the left of knowledge. The idea of a "priest's eye", therefore, is that the book should show the things that a priest needed to know. The titles of the three volumes were linked to this – the pars oculi dealing with the confessional, the dextera pars oculi, a manual of practical preaching and the sinistra pars oculi, a set of theological questions and answers. The volumes were written in reverse order, with sinistra pars oculi appearing first in 1320 and the pars oculi appearing in around 1326.

Since the Fourth Council of the Lateran in 1215, much effort was made to educate the clergy so that they could better help others understand and live essential Christian beliefs and practices. In Oculus Sacerdotis, William of Pagula wrote:

"For parish priests to rule well in this regard they should be discerning, knowing how to bind and loose sins, lest, out of ignorance, the blind take it upon themselves to lead others and they both fall into the pit. Hence the verse: 'If a blind man guide a blind man … [Matt. 15:14].' First the leader falls into the pit and then the follower."

The book was initially considered to be repetitive and badly ordered, but more modern research has suggested that the books were meant to be repetitive, with each volume dealing with the same problem in a slightly different way. The dextera pars oculi was used as a handbook until the 16th century, and a revision of it is said to have been produced by John de Burgh in 1384 as the Pupilla oculi (pupil of the eye), though it is known to have been in existence as early as 1368. The book is considered to have influenced almost all similar texts written within the next sixty years, but its lengthy prose meant that many of the parish priests it was meant to have helped could not actually read it. At least fifty copies are still known to exist in various libraries, despite the age of the book.

== Summary of Instructions ==
In 1385, a selection of twenty-one of the full book's instructions were issued. These instructions, summarized here from the Broadview translation, and many of which reflect current Catholic practices, provide insight into the religious and spiritual values of 14th-century English Christianity:

1. On the baptism of children. Although priests should be the ones to baptize infants, parents (father or mother) may perform the rite in an emergency. Should parents find themselves in such an emergency, they should say "I crysten thee in the name of the fadyr and the sone and the holy ghost" as they sprinkle water over the child. They may also immerse the child three times in water (only water, no other liquids). Although priests require celibacy, marriage relations are not restricted by the performance of this emergency ceremony, although if someone else is present and willing to perform the baptism that is preferred. The baptismal words should not under any circumstances be repeated over the child, not even later by a priest, but the child should be taken to a church soon afterward for exorcism, anointing, and other customary actions that were not performed at home. Godparents should speedily have their godchildren confirmed by a bishop, and should teach them the Lord's Prayer and the Creed; chastity, justice, and charity, as they grow up.

2. On the confirmation of children. Confirmation of a child should happen no later than the first five years of life.

3. On the physical care of children. Beware, parents, not to sleep in the same bed as infants, as the possibility of rolling over and smothering them would be considered homicide by law. Also dangerous is binding infants in swaddling clothes and leaving them alone unattended.

4. On prohibited marriage. Because of a spiritual kinship between children and their godparents and parents (as well as sponsors at confirmation), no marriage between any of these parties is allowed.

5. On marriage engagements and secret marriages. The verbal consent between a man and a woman to marry, even if not betrothed, is enough to make their marriage binding. Such a contract should be done in the presence of a priest and legitimate witnesses. Even if the verbal contract is broken by one party marrying someone else, the original marriage contract is the true contract, even if the second marriage was consummated and the first was not. Clerics, priests, or others present at secret marriages are to be suspended from office for three years.

6. On the sharing of beds between the opposite sex. No male or female older than seven years old should lie in the same bed, even siblings, to guard against fornication and incest.

7. On confession. Beginning at age 14, the faithful should confess sins to their own parish at least once a year, and receive the Body of christ during Eastertide (unless the priest counsels to abstain). With permission from one's own priest, one may confess to another suitable priest for a good reason, but otherwise, the rejection of this instruction results in banishment from entering any churches as well as banishment from a Christian burial upon death.

8. On the confession of pregnant women. Because it would be improper for a priest to hear confession during labor, pregnant women should take care of their confessions beforehand to prepare for the possible reception of the Eucharist in case life-threatening circumstances arise during labor.

9. On behavior during Mass. For all parishonors who comfortably are able, kneeling is appropriate during Mass, while saying the words, "Hail salvation of the world, Word of the Father, true sacrifice, living flesh, fully God, truly man" or "Glory to you who is born" or the Lord's prayer or other prayers. This should also be done when they see the Body of Christ.

10. On tithes. All goods legitimately acquired should be tithed. Four rewards are promised to the tithe-payers: 1) abundance of crops; 2) physical health; 3) remission of sins; 4) reward in the kingdom of heaven. Four punishments are reserved for those unfaithful in tithing: 1) because they transgress God's law, they are cursed by God; 2) they are forced to tithe; 3) God does not ward off locusts or plagues, nor does he bring but little rain to those who do not tithe well; 4) taxes are required of those who do not tithe well.

11. On feasts and fasts. To be announced by the priest which specific days should be feasts and which should be fasts.

12. On magic and sorcery. Such things are utterly unlawful, as they are ineffective to cure man or beast. Punishment for clerics who participate in these things is degrading and lay people who participate shall be excommunicated.

13. On collecting interests on loans. No usury (interest) should be imposed on the payback of money, grain, wine, oil, or anything else that is loaned, as it is expressly forbidden in the Old and the New Testaments. Punishment for clerics is suspension from office, and excommunication for lay people until restitution is made.

14. On hiking prices. Venders should not sell their goods to travelers (or others) at a higher price than can be found at market. Similarly, faithful merchants should not wait to sell their goods at a higher price. If they do, they must repay all that was gained by doing so.

15. [Translation unclear.]

16. On the tonsuring of the clergy. All clergy are required to be tonsured (the crown of their heads shaved), and this is to be announced three times yearly.

17. On Lent. During Lent, the priest should publicly preach the Creed.

18. On proper behavior in church. Parishioners should be reminded by the priest to enter church humbly, reverently, peacefully, and worshipfully, and continue to behave thus while in church. Upon hearing the sacred Name of Jesus, they should react by internally or externally genuflecting; bowing their heads; or beating their breast.

19. On church grounds. Disagreements, disturbances, or discussions should not take place in churches or graveyards, neither should fights or profane conversations, as all these things can interrupt the divine servies or remove from the holiness. Also banned: conducting business; courts or judgments; dishonorable dances; improper songs; or any other dishonorable action.

20. On spousal communication. Oaths to celibacy (chastity) should not be taken without the consent of one's spouse, along with oaths to fast, or to go on pilgrimage (except to the Holy Land). Spouses are to be equal in these matters.

21. On harboring thieves. No one should keep at home or defend anyone known to have committed a robbery.

== Bibliography ==
- Watkin, Dom Aelred (1947). Inventory of Church Goods temp. Edward III. Norfolk Records Society.
- Baker, John (1989). "Famous English canon lawyers – Part 2: William Poul (or Paull) D.Cn.L. (1332) Vicar of Winkfield, Berkshire". Ecclesiastical Law Journal. 1 (4). Ecclesiastical Law Society. doi:10.1017/S0956618X00007201. ISSN 0956-618X.
- "Bible Verses About Usury".
- Boyle, L. E. (1955). "The "Oculus Sacerdotis" and Some Other Works of William of Pagula". Transactions of the Royal Historical Society. 5. Royal Historical Society. ISSN 0960-1163.
- The Broadview Anthology of British Literature: Volume 1: The Medieval Period 2nd ed. Canada: Broadview Press. 2009. ISBN 978-1-55111-965-6.
- Hughes, Jonathan (1988). Pastors and visionaries: religion and secular life in late medieval Yorkshire. Boydell & Brewer. ISBN 0-85115-496-4.
- Pfander, H.G. (1936). "Some Medieval Manuals of Religious Instruction in England and Observations on Chaucer's Parson's Tale". The Journal of English and Germanic Philology. 35 (2): 243–258. JSTOR 27704134.
- Rubin, Miri (1992). Corpus Christi: The Eucharist in Late Medieval Culture. Cambridge University Press. ISBN 0-521-43805-5.
- Saul, Nigel (2006). Fourteenth Century England, Volume 4. Boydell Press. ISBN 1843832208.
