= Peter Collier (judge) =

Peter Collier QC is a retired British barrister and judge who served as the Recorder of Leeds from 2007 until his retirement in 2018. He is also recognized for his contributions to ecclesiastical law within the Church of England.

Collier was appointed as the Chancellor of the Diocese of York in 2006, a position he held until his retirement in 2023. He was succeeded by Lyndsey de Mestre KC in that role.

In addition to his judicial duties, Collier has been actively involved in ecclesiastical legal matters, particularly concerning safeguarding and clergy discipline. He chaired the Ecclesiastical Law Society's working group on the Clergy Discipline Measure and has delivered lectures on the subject.

Collier has a rich background in law, having practiced for nearly 40 years before becoming a judge and seeing out 11 years in office before retiring in 2018.

Collier has also been associated with St Michael le Belfrey Church in York, where he has served in various capacities, including as a Reader.
