= Canon law of the Episcopal Church in the United States =

The Anglican Communion does not have a centralised canon law of its own, unlike the canon law of the Catholic Church. Each of the autonomous member churches of the communion, however, does have a canonical system. Some, such as the Church of England, has an ancient, highly developed canon law while others, such as the Episcopal Church in the United States have more recently developed canonical systems originally based on the English canon law.

Unlike the system of canon law in the Church of England, which continues to be drawn from the canon law of the Western church, English ecclesiastical law did not remain in force in the Episcopal Church after the American Revolution. There are two parallel systems of canon law within the church operating on a national level, governed by the General Convention, and on a diocesan level, with each diocesan convention empowered to create constitutions and canons. Diocesan constitutions do not require the approval of the General Convention. The Episcopal Church is notable among Anglican churches for the extent to which the Constitution and Canons of the General Convention leave matters to regulation at the diocesan and parochial levels.

== Constitution and Canons of the Episcopal Church in the United States ==
- links at Constitution and Canons page
- White and Dykman treatise on Canon Law in the Episcopal Church

== List of Diocesan Constitutions and Canons ==
Diocese	State	Constitution/Charter & Canons
Alabama	Alabama	links at Policies page
Alaska	Alaska	links at Constitutions & Canons page, under “Our Constitution and Canons”
Albany	New York	links at Albany Diocese Documents page
Arizona	Arizona	link at The Constitution & Canons page
Arkansas	Arkansas	link at Canons & Policies page
Atlanta	Georgia	links at Governance page
Bethlehem	Pennsylvania	links at Constitution & Canons page
California	California	links at Constitution & Canons page
Central Florida	Florida	links at Policy Handbook page under “Constitution and Canons”
Central Gulf Coast	Florida	link to canons at Governance page under “Canons of the Diocese”
Central New York	New York	link at Governance & Administration page under “Constitution & Canons of the Diocese”
Central Pennsylvania	Pennsylvania	link at Constitution and Canons page
Chicago	Illinois	link at Governance page under “Download the Canons of the Diocese”
Colorado	Colorado	link at Constitution & Canons page
Connecticut	Connecticut	link at Governance page under “Constitution & Canons”
Dallas	Texas	link at Constitution & Canons page under “EDOD Constitution and Canons”
Delaware	Delaware	link at Governing Documents page under “Constitution and Canons Diocese”
East Carolina	North Carolina	link at Constitutions & Canons page
East Tennessee	Tennessee	link at “Resources” tab, under “Constitution & Canons (DioET)”
Eastern Michigan	Michigan	link at Governance page under “Constitution and Canons”
Eastern Oregon	Oregon	link at Governance/Policy page under “The Constitution and Canons”
Easton	Maryland	link at Constitution and Canons page
Eau Claire	Wisconsin	link at bottom of Home page under “Eau Claire Constitution and Canons”
El Camino Real	California	link at Constitution & Canons page
Florida	Florida	link at Forms page, under “Guidelines”, then “Diocesan Canons”
Fond du Lac	Wisconsin	link at Constitution and Canons page, under “Diocesan Canons”
Georgia	Georgia	link at Resource Library page, under “Diocese of Georgia Constitution & Canons”
Hawai’i	Hawai’i	links at “Forms & Documents” page, under “Legal”
Idaho	Idaho	link under “Policies and Canons”
Indianapolis	Indiana	link under “Resources for Diocesan Leaders”
Iowa	Iowa	links at Constitution & Canons page
Kansas	Kansas	links at Diocesan Constitution and Canons page
Kentucky	Kentucky	links at Governance Documents page
Lexington	Kentucky	link at DioLex Resources page, under “Resources for Clergy and Churches”, then “Diocesan Constitution and Canons”
Long Island	New York	link at Church Governance page, under “Canons of the Episcopal Diocese”
Los Angeles	California	link at this Directory page, under “Constitution and Canons, Diocesan”
Louisiana	Louisiana	links at Constitution & Canons page
Maine	Maine	link at Constitution & Canons page
Maryland	Maryland	link at Diocesan Constitution and Canons page
Massachusetts	Massachusetts	link at Constitution and Canons page
Michigan	Michigan	link at this page
Milwaukee	Wisconsin	link at Constitution and Canons page
Minnesota	Minnesota	link at Governing Structure page, under “Constitutions & Canons”
Mississippi	Mississippi	link at Governance page
Missouri	Missouri	link at Constitution and Canons page
Montana	Montana	link at this page, under “Diocese Canons and Constitution”
Nebraska	Nebraska	link at Diocese of Nebraska & Episcopal Church Canons page
Nevada	Nevada	links at Governance page
New Hampshire	New Hampshire	link at Governance page
New Jersey	New Jersey	link at Constitution and Canons page
New York	New York	link at this page under “Diocesan Constitution & Canons”
Newark	New Jersey	link at Constitution and Canons of the Diocese page
North Carolina	North Carolina	link at Constitution and Canons page
North Dakota	North Dakota	link at Diocesan Council page, under "The-Constitution-and-Canons-Diocese-of-North-Dakota"
North Texas	Texas	links at Constitution & Canons page
Northern California	California	links at Constitution and Canons page
Northern Indiana	Indiana	link at Diocesan Governance page, in right-hand column under photo of bishop
Northern Michigan	Michigan	link to Constitution & Canons
Northwest Texas	Texas	link at Diocesan Documents and Information page, under “Constitution and Canons”
Northwestern Pennsylvania	Pennsylvania	link at Constitution and Canons page
Ohio	Ohio	link at Governance page
Oklahoma	Oklahoma	link at Constitution and Canons page for canons; no apparent link to diocesan constitution
Olympia	Washington	link at “Constitution & Canons”
Oregon	Oregon	link at Constitution and Canons page
Pennsylvania	Pennsylvania	link at this page, under “Constitution and Canons”
Pittsburgh	Pennsylvania	link at Documents & Forms page, under “Governance”
Rhode Island	Rhode Island	link at Diocesan Constitution & Canons page
Rio Grande	New Mexico	link at Documents page, under “DRG Constitution & Canons”
Rochester	New York	link at Parish Forms & Documents page, under “Parish Finance and Administration”, then “Governance”, then “Episcopal Diocese of Rochester Constitution & Canons”
San Diego	California	link at Governance page, under “Constitutions & Canons”
San Joaquin	California	links at Governance page, under “Canons and Constitution”
South Carolina	South Carolina	links at Constitution & Canons page
South Dakota	South Dakota	link at “Diocesan Constitution & Canons”
Southeast Florida	Florida	link at “Diocesan Constitution & Canons”
Southern Ohio	Ohio	link at Resources page, under “Constitution and Canons of the Diocese”
Southern Virginia	Virginia	link at Governance page, under “Constitution & Canons”
Southwest Florida	Florida	link at Constitution and Canons of the Church page, under “Constitution and Canons of the Episcopal Diocese of Southwest Florida”
Southwestern Virginia	Virginia	links at Constitution and Canons page
Spokane	Washington	link at Governance page, under “Constitution & Canons”
Springfield	Illinois	link in Diocesan Documents & Reports page
Tennessee	Tennessee	link at Constitution and Canons page
Texas	Texas	link at Constitution & Canons page
Upper South Carolina	South Carolina	link at Constitution & Canons page
Utah	Utah	links at Governing Bodies page, at “For full descriptions of these diocesan offices, refer to the constitution and canons”
Virginia	Virginia	link at Constitution & Canons page
Washington	District of Columbia	link at Constitution and Canons page
West Missouri	Missouri	link at Documents page, under “Constitution and Canons”
West Tennessee	Tennessee	link at Constitution & Canons page
West Texas	Texas	link at Constitution & Canons page
West Virginia	West Virginia	link at Constitution & Canons page
Western Kansas	Kansas	link at Canons page
Western Louisiana	Louisiana	for Canons for Constitution
Western Massachusetts	Massachusetts	link at Resources, Policies & Forms page, in the “For Clergy” dropdown menu, then “Constitution & Canons”
Western Michigan	Michigan	link at Governance page, under “Constitution and Canons”
Western New York	New York	link at Constitution and Canons page
Western North Carolina	North Carolina	link at Our Governance page, under "Constitutions and Canons of the Diocese"
Wyoming	Wyoming	link at "Constitution & Canons" page

== See also ==
- Canon law of the Anglican Communion
- Ecclesiastical court
