= William of Pagula =

William of Pagula (died 1332), also known as William Paull or William Poull, was a 14th-century English canon lawyer and theologian best known for his written works, particularly his manual for priests entitled the Oculus Sacerdotis. Pagula was made the perpetual vicar of the church at Winkfield on 5 March 1314, although he was absent from his parish for several years while pursuing a doctorate in Canon Law from the University of Oxford. After this was granted (probably around 1320) he returned to work with his parish, and his writings are written from the perspective of someone familiar with the job of a rural priest.

As well as the Oculus Sacerdotis, Pagula also wrote the Summa Summarum, a manual of canon law, and the Summa Praelatorum, a "source book" for local parish priests. He has also been linked to two specula principum addressed to Edward III, which defend the right of royal subjects to refuse purveyance. His writings, particularly the Oculus Sacerdotis, were well received, and the Oculus has been described as the best and most influential of early modern ecclesiastical manuals.

== Life ==
Pagula was probably born near Paull in Yorkshire, and after being confirmed as the parish priest of Winkfield on 5 March 1314 he was ordained on 1 June by Walter Reynolds at Canterbury Cathedral. On 8 March 1322 he was made penitentiary for the deanery surrounding Reading, and in 1323 a canon of Old St Paul's Cathedral. He died some time in 1332.

== Writings ==
His books were all written in the 1320s after his appointment as a Doctor of Canon Law. The first was the Summa Summarum, a 350,000-word manual of canon law and theology in five books, written between 1319 and 1322. The first book deals with sources of authority such as judges, the second with legal procedure, the third with the clergy, the fourth with marriage and the fifth with criminal offences. (This order is typical of collections of papal decretals, especially the Liber extra of Pope Gregory IX.) William's anonymously published manual was a compilation and distillation of the works of other writers, particularly Guillaume Durand. Its scope was greater than Durand's works – it gave answers, not just questions, and took into account Magna Carta and English provincial differences that Durand (as a French writer) would not have included. The book was circulated widely, and although it is over 650 years old, at least thirteen copies are known to have survived.

The Oculus Sacerdotis was a manual for priests, and probably Pagula's most famous work. The book is divided into three volumes and covers practices in the confessional, sacramental theology and preaching. William drew extensively on the florilegium Manipulus florum by Thomas of Ireland. The volumes were completed by 1326 and have been described as "deep, all-encompassing and quite encyclopedic". The book was edited and republished in 1368 by John de Burgh as the Pupilla oculi, and the section of the book dealing with the confessional was in use until the late Middle Ages.

== Bibliography ==
- Baker, John (1989). "Famous English canon lawyers - Part 2: William Poul (or Paull) D.Cn.L. (1332) Vicar of Winkfield, Berkshire". Ecclesiastical Law Journal. 1 (4). Ecclesiastical Law Society. ISSN 0956-618X.
- Boyle, L. E. (1955). "The "Oculus Sacerdotis" and Some Other Works of William of Pagula". Transactions of the Royal Historical Society. 5. Royal Historical Society. ISSN 0960-1163.
- Clark, James G. (2004). "Hibernicus, Thomas (c.1270–c.1340)". Oxford Dictionary of National Biography. Oxford University Press. doi:10.1093/ref:odnb/27206.
- Rubin, Miri (1992). Corpus Christi: The Eucharist in Late Medieval Culture. Cambridge University Press. ISBN 0-521-43805-5.
- Cary J. Nederman, “The Monarch and the Marketplace: Economic Policy and Royal Finance in William of Pagula's Speculum regis Edwardi III,” History of Political Economy 33 ( 2001): 51-69.
- William of Pagula, The Mirror of King Edward III, trans. Cary J. Nederman, in Readings in Medieval Political Theory: 1100-1400, ed. Cary J. Nederman & Kate Langdon Forhan (Indianapolis: Hackett, 2000).
