= Canons of Edgar =

Medieval English ecclesiastical code

The Canons of Edgar are a set of early 11th-century ecclesiastical regulations produced in Anglo-Saxon England by Wulfstan, Archbishop of York. They were in fact not written by King Edgar; but his good governance was inspirational for Wulfstan, and thus "they hark[ed] back to better times." "The comparative success of King Edgar's reign" was a reason for Wulfstan to use the past laws for his canon laws in the early 11th century.

According to Roger Fowler, the Canons of Edgar "was central in Wulfstan's programme of reform; it also demonstrates better than any other of his works the deliberateness with which he familiarized himself with the best canonical writings to provide a basis of accepted authority for [these] reforms."

The Canons of Edgar have been called "a synthesis of church doctrine on pastoral care and clerical behaviour for use by parish priests." In the broader context, "it provides perhaps Wulfstan's most detailed account of the Church's role in English society." Proof of its importance is shown by the many revisions to it made by Wulfstan from 1004 to c. 1018.

== Sources ==
Wulfstan's sources included the writings of Ælfric of Eynsham, Theodulf of Orleans, Amalarius of Metz, and Pope Leo IV, as well as the Canons of Chalcedon.

== Specific content and canons ==
The canons primarily dealt with "instruction on proper conduct and training for secular clergy and detailed instructions on their duties, including how to conduct the mass." They dealt with varied issues concerning "pastoral care and clerical behaviour [of] parish priests."

Canons 1 and 2 concern general behaviour of respect for priests to each other, while Canons 3 and 4 concern a priest's duties to prepare for a synod.

The 8th Canon forbade priests to abandon their parish; it was based upon Canon V of the Canons of Chalcedon.

Canons 17 through 25 include but also go beyond priests, to deal with every Christian man's obligations. Canons 26 through 28, and 58, 59, and 66, are admonitions that priests act soberly. Canons 29 to 43 are specific rules about the order and holiness of the Mass. Canon 44 forbade women from serving at the altar. Canons 55 through 57 concerned the procedures for alms. Canons 60 through 64 regulated oaths and testimony by priests.

== Manuscripts ==
One version of the Canons — labelled version "D" — can be found in an eleventh-century manuscript, Corpus Christi College, Cambridge MS. 201, where it has been copied out by hand on pages 97 to 101.

Wulfstan's writing style in Latin is known for a complex rhyming scheme, which is evident in this and other manuscripts.

== Editions and translations ==
- Thorpe, Benjamin, ed. (1840). "Canons enacted under King Edgar.". Ancient laws and institutes of England. pp. 395–402 – via Biblioteca europea di informazione e cultura.
- Fowler, Roger (1972). Wulfstan's Canons of Edgar. London: Oxford University Press.
- Translation: Andrew Rabin, The Political Writings of Archbishop Wulfstan of York (Manchester, 2015), pp. 85-100.

== See also ==
- Canon law of the Church of England
  - Canon law of the Anglican Communion
- Christianity in the Middle Ages
  - Anglo-Saxon Christianity
    - Christianisation of Anglo-Saxon England
    - English Benedictine Reform
  - Celtic Christianity
    - Celtic Rite
    - Rite of Sarum
- Handbook for a Confessor, 11th-century compilation of penitential Christian texts
- Norðhymbra preosta lagu, 10th-century Anglo-Saxon legal text
- Patristics
  - Sacred tradition
