= Canon law of the Anglican Communion =

Religious laws of the Anglican Churches

The Anglican Communion does not have a centralised canon law of its own, unlike the canon law of the Catholic Church. Each of the autonomous member churches of the communion, however, does have a canonical system, and "the Anglican Communion is much more than a mere ad hoc collection of churches."

Some, such as the Church of England, has an ancient, highly developed canon law while others, such as the Episcopal Church in the United States have more recently developed canonical systems originally based on the English canon law.

There has been an emerging consensus that there is, in fact, certain commonalities between and amongst the canon laws of the various branches of the Anglican Communion.

== Background ==
In the Church of England, the ecclesiastical courts that formerly decided many matters such as disputes relating to marriage, divorce, wills, and defamation, still have jurisdiction of certain church-related matters (e.g. discipline of clergy, alteration of church property, and issues related to churchyards).

Their separate status dates back to 1072, when the Normans, under King William I, split them off from the mixed secular/religious county and local courts used by the Saxons. By the time of "King Richard I, — a distinction was established between Courts Temporal and Courts Ecclesiastical."

The first comprehensive set of canon laws that form the basis of Anglican canon law come from the Canons of Edgar, a set of early eleventh-century ecclesiastical regulations produced in Anglo-Saxon England by Wulfstan, Archbishop of York. They were in fact not written by King Edgar; but his good governance was inspiration for Wulfstan. The Canons of Edgar have been called "a synthesis of church doctrine on pastoral care and clerical behaviour for use by parish priests." Wulfstan's sources included the writings of Aelfric, Theodulf of Orleans, Amalarius of Metz, and Pope Leo IV, as well as the Canons of Chalcedon.

In contrast to the other courts of England, the law used in ecclesiastical matters is at least partially a civil law system, not common law, although heavily governed by parliamentary statutes. Since the Reformation, ecclesiastical courts in England have been royal, or "Crown courts."

The teaching of canon law at the Universities of Oxford and Cambridge was abrogated by Henry VIII; thereafter practitioners in the ecclesiastical courts were trained in civil law, receiving a Doctor of Civil Law (D.C.L.) degree from Oxford, or a Doctor of Laws (LL.D.) degree from Cambridge. Such lawyers (called "doctors" and "civilians") were centered at "Doctors Commons", a few streets south of St Paul's Cathedral in London.

Canon law and lawyers dealt with probate, matrimonial, and admiralty cases until their jurisdiction was removed to the common law courts in the mid-19th century.

Other churches in the Anglican Communion around the world (e.g., the Episcopal Church in the United States and the Anglican Church of Canada) still function under their own private systems of canon law.

In 2002 a Legal Advisors Consultation meeting at Canterbury concluded:

(1) There are principles of canon law common to the churches within the Anglican Communion; (2) Their existence can be factually established; (3) Each province or church contributes through its own legal system to the principles of canon law common within the Communion; (4) these principles have strong persuasive authority and are fundamental to the self-understanding of each of the member churches; (5) These principles have a living force, and contain within themselves the possibility for further development; and (6) The existence of the principles both demonstrates and promotes unity in the Communion.

== Examples by jurisdiction ==
- Canon law of the Church of England
- Canon law of the Episcopal Church in the United States

== See also ==
- Anglicanism
- Canons of Edgar, an 11th century synopsis by Wulfstan
- Ecclesiastical Law Society
- Religious law
- Valid but irregular
