= Ecclesiastical Law Society =

The Ecclesiastical Law Society is an organization based in the United Kingdom that says it "exists to promote the study of ecclesiastical and canon law particularly in the Church of England and those churches in communion with it". It was founded in 1987 to succeed Doctors' Commons.

The society sponsors periodic speakers and programmes, but its principal work is editing and publishing the Ecclesiastical Law Journal.

== Ecclesiastical Law Journal ==
The society publishes the Ecclesiastical Law Journal three times each year through the Cambridge University Press. The journal is a scholarly collection of original editorials, articles, comments, parliamentary and conference reports, book reviews, and case notes of decisions from the English ecclesiastical courts. The journal enjoys a distinguished international editorial board.

=== Editors ===
1987–2002
The Worshipful Michael Goodman (Chancellor of the Dioceses of Rochester, Guildford and Lincoln
2002–2013
The Worshipful Professor Mark Hill KC (Chancellor of the Dioceses of Chichester, Leeds and Europe)
2013-2021
The Reverend Dr Will Adam (Archbishop of Canterbury's Ecumenical Adviser)
2021-
Benjamin Harrison, Barrister

== See also ==
- Canon law of the Anglican Communion
- Canon law of the Church of England
