= Church Representation and Ministers Measure 2019 =

Church of England measure

Church Representation and Ministers Measure 2019 (Note: Section 3(1).)
- Measure of the Church of England
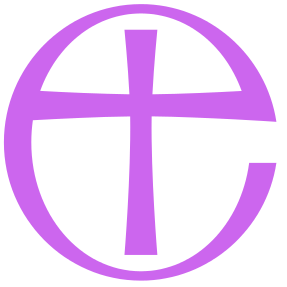
- General Synod of the Church of England
- Long title: A Measure passed by the General Synod of the Church of England to make provision about Church representation and ministers.
- Citation: 2019 No. 2
- Territorial extent: England; Channel Islands; Isle of Man; (Note: Section 3(6)–(8).)

Dates
- Royal assent: 4 July 2019
- Commencement: 4 July 2019 (section 3); 1 January 2020 (rest of act); (Note: Section 3(2)–(4). The Church Representation and Ministers Measure 2019 (Commencement) Order 2019.)

Other legislation
- Amends: Interpretation Measure 1925; Marriage Act 1949; Parochial Church Councils (Powers) Measure 1956; Synodical Government Measure 1969; Clergy Discipline Measure 2003

Status: Current legislation

Text of statute as originally enacted

Revised text of statute as amended

Text of the Church Representation and Ministers Measure 2019 as in force today (including any amendments) within the United Kingdom, from legislation.gov.uk.

The Church Representation and Ministers Measure 2019 (No. 1) is a Church of England measure passed by the General Synod of the Church of England simplifying bureaucracy of the Church of England and simplifying the electoral system of the General Synod of the Church of England.

== Provision ==
The Church of England adopted simplified representation rules, amending the Synodical Government Measure 1969:

- the age of voting for the General Synod was reduced from 17 to 16
- communication can now take place under updated data protection legislation: Data Protection Act 2018

- various procedural requirements relating to parish governance were eliminated
- names are only removed from the electoral roll annually, but continue to be added whenever is appropriate
- parochial church councils can now meet as "joint councils"
- the proportion of members appointed to the General Synod no longer has to be 70:30 if the General Synod passes a resolution approving some other proportion

The Church now requires a simple form for being put on the electoral roll - the requirement to be baptised remains.

Before the passage of this legislation, the requirements of the electoral roll were significantly vaguer.

The Church in Wales had adopted a similar rule change letting 16 and 17 year olds vote in 2014.

== Commencement ==
Unlike most measures, which are commenced with a Church of England instrument, the measure was commenced using a statutory instrument. The Church Representation and Ministers Measure 2019 (Commencement) Order 2019 (SI 2019/1460) provided that the act would come into force on 1 January 2020.
