= Church of England Assembly (Powers) Act 1919 =

Act of the Parliament of the United Kingdom

Church of England Assembly (Powers) Act 1919 (Note: Section 5.)
- Act of Parliament
- Parliament of the United Kingdom
- Long title: An Act to confer powers on the National Assembly of the Church of England constituted in accordance with the constitution attached as an Appendix to the Addresses presented to His Majesty by the Convocations of Canterbury and York on the tenth day of May nineteen hundred and nineteen, and for other purposes connected therewith.
- Citation: 9 & 10 Geo. 5. c. 76
- Territorial extent: United Kingdom

Dates
- Royal assent: 23 December 1919
- Commencement: 23 December 1919 (Note: The Acts of Parliament (Commencement) Act 1793.)
Other legislation
Amended by	Synodical Government Measure 1969; Constitutional Reform Act 2005

Status: Amended

Text of statute as originally enacted

Text of the Church of England Assembly (Powers) Act 1919 as in force today (including any amendments) within the United Kingdom, from legislation.gov.uk.

The Church of England Assembly (Powers) Act 1919 (9 & 10 Geo. 5. c. 76) is an act of the Parliament of the United Kingdom that enables the Church of England to submit primary legislation called measures, for passage by Parliament. Measures have the same force and effect as acts of Parliament. The power to pass measures was originally granted to the Church Assembly, which was replaced by the General Synod of the Church of England in 1970 by the Synodical Government Measure 1969.

The act, usually called the "Enabling Act", made possible the addition of a chamber of laymen to the chambers for bishops and clergy in the new Church Assembly. The historian Jeremy Morris has argued that it helped to buffer the Church from anti-establishmentarianism and calls it "probably the most significant single piece of legislation passed by Parliament for the Church of England in the twentieth century". The Church Assembly set up parochial church councils, which have formed the base of the Church's representative system ever since.

== Procedure ==
The act creates an Ecclesiastical Committee, consisting of fifteen members of the House of Lords chosen by the Lord Speaker, and fifteen members of the House of Commons, chosen by the Speaker of the House of Commons. The members are appointed for the duration of each parliament, and vacancies may be filled by the speaker of the relevant House. A quorum for business is twelve members.

The General Synod refers any measures it desires to pass into law to the Legislative Committee, a body appointed by the General Synod from among its own members. This committee forwards the proposed measure to the Ecclesiastical Committee, together with any comments or explanations that it or the General Synod wishes to add. The Legislative Committee may not amend the measure. Either committee has the right to consult with the other in a joint conference to debate the measure.

The Ecclesiastical Committee then drafts a report for Parliament, "stating the nature and legal effect of the measure, and its views as to the expediency thereof, especially with relation to the constitutional rights of all His Majesty’s subjects". The Legislative Committee may then decide whether to allow the report to be presented to Parliament, or withdraw the measure. The General Synod may also direct the committee to withdraw the measure. The Ecclesiastical Committee may not present the report without permission from the Legislative Committee.

If the Legislative Committee wishes to proceed, then the report and the measure are both presented to each House of Parliament. If both Houses pass a resolution agreeing to the measure, then it is presented to the monarch to receive royal assent. On receiving royal assent it becomes a law.

== Jurisdiction ==
The act states:

A measure may relate to any matter concerning the Church of England, and may extend to the amendment or repeal in whole or in part of any Act of Parliament, including this Act.

However, a measure may not affect the "composition or powers or duties" of the Ecclesiastical Committee, or the procedure in Parliament for passing measures.

== Human Rights Act ==
Under section 10(6) of the Human Rights Act 1998, measures of the Church Assembly or of the General Synod of the Church of England are exempt from the "fast track" procedure under that Act by which government ministers may, with a reduced level of parliamentary scrutiny, amend legislation incompatible with a human right under the European Convention on Human Rights. The courts may still issue a declaration of incompatibility or, in preference, purposively interpret a measure to avoid incompatibility.

== See also ==
- Church of England measure, List of Church of England measures
- Church of England instrument
