= Parochial Church Councils (Powers) Measure 1956 =

Church of England measure

Parochial Church Councils (Powers) Measure 1956 (Note: Section 10(4).)
- Measure of the Church of England
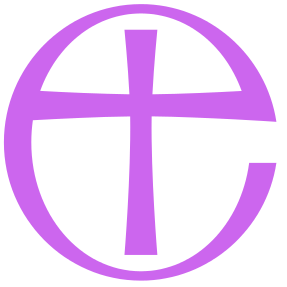
- National Assembly of the Church of England
- Long title: A Measure passed by the National Assembly of the Church of England To consolidate with amendments certain enactments relating to parochial church councils and parochial charities.
- Citation: 4 & 5 Eliz. 2. No. 3
- Territorial extent: Province of Canterbury; Province of York; (Note: Section 10(3).)

Dates
- Royal assent: 5 July 1956
- Commencement: 2 January 1957 (Note: Section 10(2).)

Other legislation
- Repeals/revokes: Parochial Church Councils (Powers) Measure 1921; Parochial Church Councils (Powers) (Amendment) Measure 1949
- Amended by: Secretary of State for Education and Science Order 1964; Synodical Government Measure 1969; Transfer of Functions (Wales) Order 1970; Pastoral Measure 1983; Church of England (Miscellaneous Provisions) Measure 1983; Diocesan Boards of Education Measure 1991; Team and Group Ministries Measure 1995; Church of England (Legal Aid and Miscellaneous Provisions) Measure 1988; Church of England (Miscellaneous Provisions) Measure 2005; Charities Act 2006; Mission and Pastoral Measure 2011; Church of England (Miscellaneous Provisions) Measure 2014; Ecclesiastical Property Measure 2015; Church of England (Miscellaneous Provisions) Measure 2018; Church Representation and Ministers Measure 2019; Charities Act 2022

Status: Amended

Text of statute as originally enacted

Revised text of statute as amended

Text of the Parochial Church Councils (Powers) Measure 1956 as in force today (including any amendments) within the United Kingdom, from legislation.gov.uk.

The Parochial Church Councils (Powers) Measure 1956 (4 & 5 Eliz. 2. No. 3) is a measure passed by the Church Assembly of the Church of England that gave parish-level parochial church councils (PCCs) various miscellaneous powers such as framing an annual budget, power to make levy and collect a voluntary church rate, power jointly with the minister to appoint and dismiss the parish clerk and determine his salary, and the right to make representations to the bishop "with regard to any matter affecting the welfare of the church in the parish".

The measure forbade councils from acquiring property or real estate without the consent of the diocesan authority, and it also required PCCs to present their accounts annually, and invested bishops with the power to ensure the measure was followed.

The measure came into effect on 2 January 1957, and repealed the Parochial Church Councils (Powers) Measure 1921 and the Parochial Church Councils (Powers) (Amendment) Measure 1949.
