= Church rate =

Tax in England and Ireland

The church rate was a tax formerly levied in each parish in England and Ireland for the benefit of the parish church. The rates were used to meet the costs of carrying on divine service, repairing the fabric of the church and paying the salaries of the connected officials.

Except for a brief period during the Commonwealth of England in the 17th century, the raising of church rates has never been confirmed by statute. It was always a matter of common law. The compulsory levying of the church rate was abolished by statute in 1868; however, it remains on a voluntary basis in many parishes. Chancel repair liability in England, however, remains enforceable by law.

== History ==
The church rates were set by the churchwardens together with the parishioners, who were duly assembled after proper notice had been posted in the church vestry or the church. The rates thus set were recoverable in the ecclesiastical court, or, if the arrears did not exceed £10 and no questions were raised as to the legal liability, before two justices of the peace. Any payment made out of the rate which was not strictly recognised by law destroyed its validity.

The church rate was a personal charge imposed on the occupier of land or of a house in the parish, and, though it was compulsory, it was often difficult to enforce: especially so in the case of Nonconformists, who had conscientious objections to supporting the Established Church; in Ireland, where the population was mostly Roman Catholic, the grievance was specially felt and resented.

The objections of the Nonconformists were not only on principle. The Church of England received financial support from Parliament, while Nonconformist congregations were entirely dependent on voluntary contributions. They did not want to have to support another parish as well as their own.

Enforcement of the rate was not uniform across the country. Resolutions were passed protesting against the rate, and societies to abolish the rate were formed all over the country. In 1836 at a public meeting in London, a central committee, the Church Rate Abolition Society, was formed to co-ordinate the efforts of local abolitionist Societies.

In 1837, Parliament made two concessions to the Nonconformists: a more acceptable marriage ceremony, and the civil registration of births, deaths and marriages. However, the parish rate remained compulsory until 1868. The Whig leader in the House of Commons, Lord John Russell, supported the rate but in 1856 The Times called the government's attention to what the editor believed was a civil war raging throughout the country on the church rate question.

Compulsory Church Rate Abolition Act 1868 (Note: Section 11.)
- Act of Parliament
- Parliament of the United Kingdom
- Long title: An Act for the Abolition of compulsory Church Rates.
- Citation: 31 & 32 Vict. c. 109
- Territorial extent: United Kingdom

Dates
- Royal assent: 31 July 1868
- Commencement: 31 July 1868 (Note: The Acts of Parliament (Commencement) Act 1793.)
Other legislation
Amended by	Statute Law Revision Act 1875; Church of England (Miscellaneous Provisions) Measure 1992

Status: Amended

Text of statute as originally enacted

Revised text of statute as amended

Text of the Compulsory Church Rate Abolition Act 1868 as in force today (including any amendments) within the United Kingdom, from legislation.gov.uk.

The Compulsory Church Rate Abolition Act 1868 (31 & 32 Vict. c. 109) church rates no longer compulsory, but merely voluntary, with those who were not willing to pay the rate being excluded from inquiring into, objecting to or voting in respect of their expenditure.

== Present day ==
Parochial church councils may continue to levy voluntary rates by virtue of the Parochial Church Councils (Powers) Measure 1956 (4 & 5 Eliz. 2. No. 3).

All Church of England churches within the City of London continue to levy the church rate.

Hampstead Parish Church has documented their procedures for raising a voluntary rate, by way of good practice.
