= Pastoral Measure 1983 =

Measure of the General Synod of the Church of England

Pastoral Measure 1983 (Note: Section 94(1).)
- Measure of the Church of England
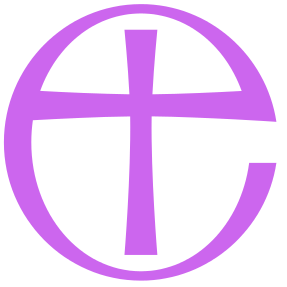
- General Synod of the Church of England
- Long title: A Measure passed by the General Synod of the Church of England to consolidate with minor amendments the Pastoral Measure 1968, the Pastoral (Amendment) Measure 1982 and related enactments, which are designed to make better provision for the cure of souls.
- Citation: 1983 No. 1
- Territorial extent: Canterbury; York; (Note: Section 94(2). The measure could also be applied to the Channel Islands, in accordance with the Channel Islands (Church Legislation) Measures 1931 and 1957, and extended to the Isle of Man by Act of Tynwald; it was so extended, with effect from 1 January 1991, by the Pastoral Measure (Isle of Man) 1990.)

Dates
- Royal assent: 9 May 1983
- Commencement: 1 November 1983 (Note: Section 94(4). The first day on which all the provisions of the Pastoral (Amendment) Measure 1982 came into operation was 1 November 1983, by an instrument dated 31 July 1983.)
- Repealed: 1 July 2012 (Note: The Mission and Pastoral Measure 2011 (Appointed Day) Instrument 2012 (S.I. 2012/1).)

Other legislation
- Amends: See § Repealed enactments
- Repeals/revokes: See § Repealed enactments
- Amended by: Pastoral (Amendment) Measure 1994; Team and Group Ministries Measure 1995; Church of England (Miscellaneous Provisions) Measure 1995; National Institutions Measure 1998; Church of England (Miscellaneous Provisions) Measure 2000; Synodical Government (Amendment) Measure 2003; Church of England (Miscellaneous Provisions) Measure 2005; Church of England (Miscellaneous Provisions) Measure 2006; Dioceses, Pastoral and Mission Measure 2007; Ecclesiastical Offices (Terms of Service) Measure 2009
- Repealed by: Mission and Pastoral Measure 2011

Status: Repealed

Text of statute as originally enacted

Revised text of statute as amended

The Pastoral Measure 1983 (No. 1) was a measure of the General Synod of the Church of England that consolidated, with minor amendments, the Pastoral Measure 1968 (No. 1), the Pastoral (Amendment) Measure 1982 (No. 1) and related enactments concerned with the pastoral reorganisation of parishes and benefices in the Church of England, including the union and division of benefices, the creation of team and group ministries, and the declaration and disposal of redundant churches.

== Provisions ==
=== Repealed enactments ===
Section 93 of the act repealed 7 enactments, listed in schedule 9 to the act.

Citation	Short title	Extent of repeal
1968 No. 1	Pastoral Measure 1968	The whole measure.
1970 No. 2	Sharing of Church Buildings Measure 1970	Section 1.
1972 c. 70	Local Government Act 1972	In Schedule 29, paragraph 39.
1976 No. 4	Endowments and Glebe Measure 1976	Section 38(4) and (5).
1978 No. 2	Parochial Registers and Records Measure 1978	Section 19(4).
1982 No. 1	Pastoral (Amendment) Measure 1982	The whole measure.
1983 No. 2	Church of England (Miscellaneous Provisions) Measure 1983	Section 11.

== Subsequent developments ==
The measure's application was extended to the Isle of Man, with effect from 1 January 1991, by the Pastoral Measure (Isle of Man) 1990. (Note: GC 131/90.)

The whole measure was repealed by section 111 of, and schedule 9 to, the Mission and Pastoral Measure 2011, which came into force on 1 July 2012.
