= Church of England (Worship and Doctrine) Measure 1974 =

Measure of the General Synod of the Church of England

Church of England (Worship and Doctrine) Measure 1974 (Note: Section 7(1).)
- Measure of the Church of England
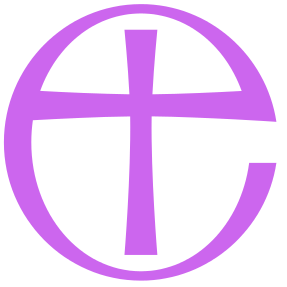
- General Synod of the Church of England
- Long title: A Measure passed by the General Synod of the Church of England to enable provision to be made by Canon with respect to worship in the Church of England and other matters prescribed by the Book of Common Prayer, and with respect to the obligations and forms of assent or subscription to the doctrine of the Church of England; to repeal enactments relating to the matters aforesaid; and for purposes connected therewith.
- Citation: 1974 No. 3
- Territorial extent: England (Note: Section 7(3).); Channel Islands (Note: The Church of England (Worship and Doctrine) Measure 1974 (Channel Islands) Order 1984.)

Dates
- Royal assent: 12 December 1974
- Commencement: 1 September 1975

Other legislation
- Amends: Submission of the Clergy Act 1533; Act of Uniformity 1662; Clerical Subscription Act 1865; Universities Tests Act 1871; City of London (Guild Churches) Act 1952; Ecclesiastical Jurisdiction Measure 1963; Clergy (Ordination and Miscellaneous Provisions) Measure 1964; Pastoral Measure 1968; Prayer Book (Further Provisions) Measure 1968; Statute Law (Repeals) Act 1969; Synodical Government Measure 1969
- Repeals/revokes: Act of Uniformity 1548; Act of Uniformity 1558; Act of Uniformity Amendment Act 1872; Holy Table Measure 1964; Prayer Book (Alternative and other Services) Measure 1965
- Relates to: Clergy Act 1533

Status: Current legislation

Text of statute as originally enacted

Revised text of statute as amended

Text of the Church of England (Worship and Doctrine) Measure 1974 (No. 3) as in force today (including any amendments) within the United Kingdom, from legislation.gov.uk.

The Church of England (Worship and Doctrine) Measure 1974 (No. 3) is a Church of England measure passed by the General Synod of the Church of England. The measure gave the General Synod the power to reform the liturgy of the Church of England.

The measure was the outcome of the controversy over the use of the 1662 Book of Common Prayer, the conflict between those who wished to preserve the 1662 prayer book and those who advocated new forms of worship that employed modern language and symbolism. The report of the Archbishop's Commission, chaired by Owen Chadwick, was published in 1970 under the title Church and State. It recommended that Parliament should pass the regulation of the church to the General Synod rather than disestablishment.

The sociologist of religion James A. Beckford said there was "a deep cleavage within the Church of England between, on the one hand, the view that the church represented the whole nation and should therefore retain the cultural form in which the nation's ethnic and historical particularity was embodied, and, on the other, the view that the church could only exercise effective influence over the course of events by adapting its liturgy to modern cultural forms".

Opponents of the Measure said it was inconsistent with the Church's status as the national church but were pleased with the provision that the 1662 liturgy could still be used in a minority of parishes. Roger Scruton said the Measure "was to the great detriment of the power and authority of the Church", and added: "it was this measure that has allowed the creeping disestablishment of the Church, so that 'alternative services' can be laid before the congregation as though it were freedom rather than certainty that they wished for".
