= List of Church of England measures =

This is a list of Church of England measures, which are the legislation of the Church of England. Some of these measures may have been repealed. Since 1970, measures have been made by the General Synod; prior to then they were made by its predecessor, the National Assembly of the Church of England, often referred to as the Church Assembly.

Under the Church of England Assembly (Powers) Act 1919 (9 & 10 Geo. 5. c. 76), measures have the same force as an act of Parliament.

indicates that a measure is available to view at legislation.gov.uk.

== Church of England measures ==
Short title	Citation	Royal assent
Long title
Convocations of the Clergy Measure 1920	10 & 11 Geo. 5. No. 1	23 December 1920
A Measure passed by the National Assembly of the Church of England declaring the Power of each of the Convocations of Canterbury and York to Amend the Constitution of the Lower House thereof.
Parochial Church Councils (Powers) Measure 1921 (repealed)	11 & 12 Geo. 5. No. 1	1 July 1921
A Measure passed by the National Assembly of the Church of England to confer powers on Parochial Church Councils and to amend the law relating to the parochial organisation of the Church of England, and for other purposes connected therewith. (Repealed by Parochial Church Councils (Powers) Measure 1956 (4 & 5 Eliz. 2. No. 3))
Ecclesiastical Commissioners Measure 1921 (repealed)	11 & 12 Geo. 5. No. 2	28 July 1921
A Measure passed by the National Assembly of the Church of England to amend the Ecclesiastical Commissioners Act, 1840. (Note: Ecclesiastical Commissioners Act 1840 (3 & 4 Vict. c. 113)) (Repealed by Clergy Pensions Measure 1926 (16 & 17 Geo. 5. No. 6))
Union of Benefices Measure 1921 (repealed)	11 & 12 Geo. 5. No. 3	17 August 1921
A Measure passed by the National Assembly of the Church of England to continue the operation of the Union of Benefices Act, 1919, (Note: Union of Benefices Act 1919 (9 & 10 Geo. 5. c. 98)) for a further period of two years. (Repealed by Statute Law Revision Act 1950 (14 Geo. 6. c. 6))
Representation of the Laity (Amendment) Measure 1922 (repealed)	12 & 13 Geo. 5. No. 1	12 April 1922
A Measure passed by the National Assembly of the Church of England to amend the Rules for the Representation of the Laity contained in the Schedule to the Constitution of the National Assembly of the Church of England. (Repealed by Representation of the Laity Measure 1929 (19 & 20 Geo. 5. No. 2))
Pluralities Act 1838 (Amendment) Measure 1922 (repealed)	12 & 13 Geo. 5. No. 2	4 August 1922
A Measure passed by the National Assembly of the Church of England to repeal Sections 52 and 53 of the Pluralities Act, 1838. (Note: Pluralities Act 1838 (1 & 2 Vict. c. 106)) (Repealed by Statute Law Revision Act 1950 (14 Geo. 6. c. 6))
Revised Tables of Lessons Measure 1922	12 & 13 Geo. 5. No. 3	4 August 1922
A Measure passed by the National Assembly of the Church of England to amend the Law relating to the Tables of Lessons contained in the Prayer Book.
Benefices Act 1898 (Amendment) Measure 1923 (Note: Although passed in 1924, the short title specifies the year 1923.) (repealed)	14 & 15 Geo. 5. No. 1	14 July 1924
A Measure passed by the National Assembly of the Church of England to amend the Law relating to the Patronage of Benefices and to amend the Benefices Act, 1898. (Note: Benefices Act 1898 (61 & 62 Vict. c. 48)) (Repealed by Patronage (Benefices) Measure 1986 (No. 3))
Union of Benefices Measure 1923 (repealed)	14 & 15 Geo. 5. No. 2	14 July 1924
A Measure passed by the National Assembly of the Church of England to make provision for Unions of Benefices outside the City of London, for disunions, alteration of boundaries and other purposes, and for matters incidental thereto. (Repealed by Pastoral Measure 1968 (No. 1))
Ecclesiastical Dilapidations Measure 1923	14 & 15 Geo. 5. No. 3	14 July 1924
A Measure passed by the National Assembly of the Church of England to amend the Law with regard to Ecclesiastical Dilapidations, and for other purposes.
Bishopric of Blackburn Measure 1923	14 & 15 Geo. 5. No. 4	14 July 1924
A Measure passed by the National Assembly of the Church of England to provide for the foundation of a Bishopric of Blackburn.
Diocese of Southwell (Division) Measure 1923 (repealed)	14 & 15 Geo. 5. No. 5	14 July 1924
A Measure passed by the National Assembly of the Church of England to provide for the Division of the Diocese of Southwell, the Foundation of a Bishopric of Derby, for the transfer of certain patronages to the Bishop of Southwell, and for purposes connected therewith. (Repealed by Statute Law (Repeals) Act 1973 (c. 39))
Diocese of Winchester (Division) Measure 1923 (repealed)	14 & 15 Geo. 5. No. 6	1 August 1924
A Measure passed by the National Assembly of the Church of England to provide for the division of the Diocese of Winchester, and for the Foundation of Bishoprics of Portsmouth and of Guildford. (Repealed by Statute Law (Repeals) Act 1973 (c. 39))
Interpretation Measure 1925	15 & 16 Geo. 5. No. 1	28 May 1925
A Measure passed by the National Assembly of the Church of England to provide for the construction of the Constitution of the National Assembly of the Church of England referred to in the Church of England Assembly (Powers) Act, 1919, (Note: Church of England Assembly (Powers) Act 1919 (9 & 10 Geo. 5. c. 76)) and for the construction and proof of Measures passed under that Act.
Bishopric of Leicester Measure 1925 (repealed)	15 & 16 Geo. 5. No. 2	31 July 1925
A Measure passed by the National Assembly of the Church of England to provide for the foundation of a Bishopric of Leicester. (Repealed by Statute Law (Repeals) Act 1973 (c. 39))
Diocesan Boards of Finance Measure 1925	15 & 16 Geo. 5. No. 3	22 December 1925
A Measure passed by the National Assembly of the Church of England to make provision for the Powers, Duties and Constitution of Diocesan Boards of Finance.
Brislington Parishes (Transfer) Measure 1926	16 & 17 Geo. 5. No. 1	26 March 1926
A Measure passed by the National Assembly of the Church of England to transfer the parishes of Brislington Saint Luke and Brislington Saint Anne from the Diocese of Bath and Wells to the Diocese of Bristol, and for purposes connected therewith.
Rural Deaneries of Pontefract and Hemsworth (Transfer) Measure 1926	16 & 17 Geo. 5. No. 2	26 March 1926
A Measure passed by the National Assembly of the Church of England to transfer the Rural Deaneries of Pontefract and Hemsworth from the Diocese of York to the Diocese of Wakefield, to provide for additional honorary canonries in the Cathedral Church of Wakefield, and for purposes connected therewith.
Parish of Manchester Division Act 1850 (Amendment) Measure 1926 (repealed)	16 & 17 Geo. 5. No. 3	29 April 1926
A Measure passed by the National Assembly of the Church of England to sever the canonries in the Cathedral Church of Manchester from the benefices annexed thereto, and otherwise to amend the Parish of Manchester Division Act, 1850. (Note: Parish of Manchester Division Act 1850 (13 & 14 Vict. c. 41)) (Repealed by Cathedrals Measure 1963 (No. 2))
Ecclesiastical Commissioners Measure 1926	16 & 17 Geo. 5. No. 4	15 July 1926
A Measure passed by the National Assembly of the Church of England to amend the Ecclesiastical Commissioners Acts, 1840 and 1841, (Note: Ecclesiastical Commissioners Act 1841 (4 & 5 Vict. c. 39)) and the Ecclesiastical Commissioners Act, 1840, Amendment Act, 1885, (Note: Ecclesiastical Commissioners Act 1840 Amendment Act 1885 (48 & 49 Vict. c. 55)) and to make further provision for the augmentation of archdeaconries, for aiding the endowment funds of new bishoprics, for bishops' costs of legal proceedings, for the maintenance of Lambeth Palace, and the repair of other Episcopal Residences.
First Fruits and Tenths Measure 1926 (repealed)	16 & 17 Geo. 5. No. 5	15 July 1926
A Measure passed by the National Assembly of the Church of England to provide for the extinguishment or redemption of first fruits and tenths. (Repealed by Statute Law (Repeals) Act 1993 (c. 50))
Clergy Pensions Measure 1926 (repealed)	16 & 17 Geo. 5. No. 6	4 August 1926
A Measure passed by the National Assembly of the Church of England to establish a system of Pensions for the Clergy (other than Diocesan Bishops), to provide for the transition from the Incumbents Resignation Acts, 1871 (Note: Incumbents Resignation Act 1871 (34 & 35 Vict. c. 44)) and 1887, (Note: Incumbents' Resignation Act 1871 (Amendment) Act 1887 (50 & 51 Vict. c. 23)) to such system, and to effect changes in the constitution and management of the Clergy Pensions Institution. (Repealed by Clergy Pensions Measure 1948 (11 & 12 Geo. 6. No. 1))
Episcopal Pensions Measure 1926 (repealed)	16 & 17 Geo. 5. No. 7	15 December 1926
A Measure passed by the National Assembly of the Church of England to provide for Bishops' Pensions. (Repealed by Clergy Pensions Measure 1961 (9 & 10 Eliz. 2. No. 3))
Benefices (Ecclesiastical Duties) Measure 1926	16 & 17 Geo. 5. No. 8	15 December 1926
A Measure passed by the National Assembly of the Church of England to consolidate and amend the law relating to the due performance of the Ecclesiastical Duties of Benefices, and to make provision for the Stipends of Curates appointed under the Measure and in certain other cases.
Indian Church Measure 1927 (repealed)	17 & 18 Geo. 5. No. 1	23 November 1927
A Measure passed by the National Assembly of the Church of England to provide for the dissolution of the legal union between the Church of England and the Church of England in India, and to make provisions consequential thereon. (Repealed by Statute Law (Repeals) Act 1976 (c. 16))
Clergy Pensions (Amendment) Measure 1927 (repealed)	17 & 18 Geo. 5. No. 2	23 November 1927
A Measure passed by the National Assembly of the Church of England to amend the Clergy Pensions Measure, 1926. (Note: Clergy Pensions Measure 1926 (16 & 17 Geo. 5. No. 6)) (Repealed by Clergy Pensions Measure 1948 (11 & 12 Geo. 6. No. 1))
New Dioceses (Transitional Provisions) Measure 1927	17 & 18 Geo. 5. No. 3	23 November 1927
A Measure passed by the National Assembly of the Church of England to make temporary provision for representation in the House of Laity and the constitution of Diocesan Conferences upon the foundation of new bishopricks, and for purposes connected therewith.
Ecclesiastical Commissioners (Provision for Unbeneficed Clergy) Measure 1928	18 & 19 Geo. 5. No. 1	2 July 1928
A Measure passed by the National Assembly of the Church of England to amend the Ecclesiastical Commissioners Act, 1840.
Tithe (Administration of Trusts) Measure 1928 (repealed)	18 & 19 Geo. 5. No. 2	3 August 1928
A Measure passed by the National Assembly of the Church of England to regulate the administration of the trusts affecting tithe rent-charge and other rent-charges, rents and payments in lieu of tithe vested in Queen Anne's Bounty in trust for incumbents of benefices, and for purposes connected therewith. (Repealed by Statute Law (Repeals) Act 1998 (c. 43))
Clergy Pensions (Amendment) Measure 1928 (repealed)	18 & 19 Geo. 5. No. 3	3 August 1928
A Measure passed by the National Assembly of the Church of England to amend the Clergy Pensions Measure, 1926. (Repealed by Clergy Pensions Measure 1948 (11 & 12 Geo. 6. No. 1))
Parochial Registers and Records Measure 1929 (repealed)	19 & 20 Geo. 5. No. 1	10 May 1929
A Measure passed by the National Assembly of the Church of England to provide for the better care of Parochial Registers and other Records in Ecclesiastical custody, and the establishment of Diocesan Record Offices. (Repealed by Parochial Registers and Records Measure 1978)
Representation of the Laity Measure 1929 (repealed)	19 & 20 Geo. 5. No. 2	10 May 1929
A Measure passed by the National Assembly of the Church of England to amend the Rules for the Representation of the Laity contained in the Schedule to the Constitution. (Repealed by Representation of the Laity Measure 1956 (4 & 5 Eliz. 2. No. 2))
Ecclesiastical Dilapidations (Amendment) Measure 1929	19 & 20 Geo. 5. No. 3	10 May 1929
A Measure passed by the National Assembly of the Church of England to amend the Ecclesiastical Dilapidations Measure, 1923.
Westminster Abbey Measure 1929	19 & 20 Geo. 5. No. 4	10 May 1929
A Measure passed by the National Assembly of the Church of England to make further provision as to the apportionment of the income of the Dean and Chapter of Westminster.
Parsonages Measure 1930 (repealed)	20 & 21 Geo. 5. No. 1	20 March 1930
A Measure passed by the National Assembly of the Church of England to consolidate and amend the Law relating to the sale, purchase and improvement of Parsonage Houses. (Repealed by Parsonages Measure 1938 (1 & 2 Geo. 6. No. 3))
Archdeaconry of Surrey Measure 1930 (repealed)	20 & 21 Geo. 5. No. 2	20 March 1930
A Measure passed by the National Assembly of the Church of England to provide for the disannexation from the Archdeaconry of Surrey of the Canonry in Winchester Cathedral now annexed thereto; for the suspension of the said Canonry; and for the foundation of Canonries in the Cathedral Churches of Guildford and Portsmouth and the endowment thereof out of the corporate property of the Dean and Chapter of Winchester. (Repealed by Cathedrals Measure 1963 (No. 2)
Marriage Measure 1930 (repealed)	20 & 21 Geo. 5. No. 3	20 March 1930
A Measure passed by the National Assembly of the Church of England to enable marriages to be solemnized in any church which is the usual place of worship of the persons to be married or of either of them. (Repealed by Marriage Act 1949 (12, 13 & 14 Geo. 6. c. 76))
Ecclesiastical Commissioners (Pensions of Church Estates Commissioners) Measure 1930	20 & 21 Geo. 5. No. 4	15 April 1930
A Measure passed by the National Assembly of the Church of England to enable pensions to be granted to certain of the Church Estates Commissioners.
Ecclesiastical Commissioners (Sodor and Man) Measure 1930	20 & 21 Geo. 5. No. 5	15 April 1930
A Measure passed by the National Assembly of the Church of England to enable the Ecclesiastical Commissioners to make additional provision for the Cure of Souls in parishes in the Diocese of Sodor and Man.
Clergy Pensions (Older Incumbents) Measure 1930 (repealed)	20 & 21 Geo. 5. No. 6	4 June 1930
A Measure passed by the National Assembly of the Church of England to establish a system of Pensions for Older Incumbents, and for that purpose to amend the Incumbents Resignation Acts, 1871 and 1887, and the Clergy Pensions Measures, 1926 to 1928. (Repealed by Clergy Pensions Measure 1961 (9 & 10 Eliz. 2. No. 3))
Pluralities Measure 1930 (repealed)	20 & 21 Geo. 5. No. 7	1 August 1930
A Measure passed by the National Assembly of the Church of England to amend the law relating to the holding of benefices in plurality, and for that purpose to extend the powers exerciseable under the Union of Benefices Measure, 1923. (Note: Union of Benefices Measure 1923 (14 & 15 Geo. 5. No. 2)) (Repealed by Pastoral Measure 1968 (No. 1))
Benefices (Transfer of Rights of Patronage) Measure 1930	20 & 21 Geo. 5. No. 8	1 August 1930
A Measure passed by the National Assembly of the Church of England to regulate the transfer of the Rights of Patronage of Benefices.
Episcopal Pensions (Sodor and Man) Measure 1931 (repealed)	21 & 22 Geo. 5. No. 1	27 March 1931
A Measure passed by the National Assembly of the Church of England to extend the Episcopal Pensions Measure, 1926, (Note: Episcopal Pensions Measure 1926 (16 & 17 Geo. 5. No. 7)) with modifications to the bishopric of Sodor and Man, and to make consequential provisions. (Repealed by Clergy Pensions Measure 1961 (9 & 10 Eliz. 2. No. 3))
Ecclesiastical Commissioners (Loans for Church Training Colleges) Measure 1931	21 & 22 Geo. 5. No. 2	27 March 1931
A Measure passed by the National Assembly of the Church of England to enable the Ecclesiastical Commissioners to make or guarantee loans for purposes in connection with Church of England Training Colleges.
Benefices (Exercise of Rights of Presentation) Measure 1931 (repealed)	21 & 22 Geo. 5. No. 3	8 July 1931
A Measure passed by the National Assembly of the Church of England to regulate the exercise of rights of presentation to benefices. (Repealed by Patronage (Benefices) Measure 1986 (No. 3))
Channel Islands (Church Legislation) Measure 1931	21 & 22 Geo. 5. No. 4	8 July 1931
A Measure passed by the National Assembly of the Church of England to make further provision for the application to the Channel Islands of Measures passed by the Church Assembly.
Channel Islands (Representation) Measure 1931	21 & 22 Geo. 5. No. 5	8 July 1931
A Measure passed by the National Assembly of the Church of England to provide for the representation of the Channel Islands in the House of Laity and in the Diocesan Conference of the Diocese of Winchester.
Ecclesiastical Commissioners (Provision for Unbeneficed Clergy) Measure 1928 (Amendment) Measure 1931	21 & 22 Geo. 5. No. 6	8 July 1931
A Measure passed by the National Assembly of the Church of England to amend the Ecclesiastical Commissioners (Provision for Unbeneficed Clergy) Measure, 1928. (Note: Ecclesiastical Commissioners (Provision for Unbeneficed Clergy) Measure 1928 (18 & 19 Geo. 5. No. 1))
Cathedrals Measure 1931 (repealed)	21 & 22 Geo. 5. No. 7	8 July 1931
A Measure passed by the National Assembly of the Church of England to establish and to define the functions, powers, and duties of the Cathedral Commissioners for England, to make provision with respect to the constitutions, the property and revenues, the statutes of cathedral churches and the patronage of the canonries therein, and in certain cases with respect to the election of bishops by the chapters thereof, to enable the Ecclesiastical Commissioners to make grants for the benefit of cathedral churches, and for purposes connected therewith. (Repealed by Church of England (Miscellaneous Provisions) Measure 1992 (No. 1))
Benefices (Diocesan Boards of Patronage) Measure 1932 (repealed)	22 & 23 Geo. 5. No. 1	16 June 1932
A Measure passed by the National Assembly of the Church of England to establish Diocesan Boards of Patronage. (Repealed by Patronage (Benefices) Measure 1986 (No. 3))
Benefices (Purchase of Rights of Patronage) Measure 1933 (repealed)	23 & 24 Geo. 5. No. 1	29 March 1933
A Measure passed by the National Assembly of the Church of England to enable the Parochial Church Councils to purchase rights of patronage in certain cases. (Repealed by Patronage (Benefices) Measure 1986 (No. 3))
Wythenshawe Parishes (Transfer) Measure 1933	23 & 24 Geo. 5. No. 2	28 June 1933
A Measure passed by the National Assembly of the Church of England to transfer the parish of Northenden and parts of the parishes of Baguley and Timperley from the Diocese of Chester to the Diocese of Manchester, and for purposes connected therewith.
Parish of Manchester Revenues Measure 1933	23 & 24 Geo. 5. No. 3	28 July 1933
A Measure passed by the National Assembly of the Church of England to allocate the Revenues of the Dean and Canons of the Cathedral or Collegiate and Parish Church of Manchester and for purposes connected therewith.
Benefices (Sequestrations) Measure 1933	23 & 24 Geo. 5. No. 4	17 November 1933
A Measure passed by the National Assembly of the Church of England to make further provision with regard to the administration of the property of vacant benefices and to confer certain powers upon sequestrators appointed under the Benefices (Ecclesiastical Duties) Measure, 1926. (Note: Benefices (Ecclesiastical Duties) Measure 1926 (16 & 17 Geo. 5. No. 8))
Clerical Disabilities Act 1870 (Amendment) Measure 1934	24 & 25 Geo. 5. No. 1	22 June 1934
A Measure passed by the National Assembly of the Church of England to amend the Clerical Disabilities Act, 1870, (Note: Clerical Disabilities Act 1870 (33 & 34 Vict. c. 91)) by enabling clerks in Holy Orders who have availed themselves of that Act to resume the position of officiating ministers.
Banns of Marriage Measure 1934 (repealed)	24 & 25 Geo. 5. No. 2	31 July 1934
A Measure passed by the National Assembly of the Church of England to amend and declare the law relating to the publication of Banns of Marriage and for purposes connected therewith. (Repealed by Marriage Act 1949 (12, 13 & 14 Geo. 6. c. 76))
Cathedrals (Amendment) Measure 1934 (repealed)	24 & 25 Geo. 5. No. 3	31 July 1934
A Measure passed by the National Assembly of the Church of England to amend the law relating to Cathedral Churches. (Repealed by Cathedrals Measure 1963 (No. 2))
Diocese of Southwell (Transfer) Measure 1935 (repealed)	25 & 26 Geo. 5. No. 1	2 August 1935
A Measure passed by the National Assembly of the Church of England to transfer the Diocese of Southwell from the Province of Canterbury to the Province of York. (Repealed by Statute Law (Repeals) Act 1973 (c. 39))
Farnham Castle Measure 1935 (repealed)	25 & 26 Geo. 5. No. 2	2 August 1935
A Measure passed by the National Assembly of the Church of England to provide for the transfer to the Ecclesiastical Commissioners of so much of Farnham Castle as has been provided for an episcopal house of residence for the Bishopric of Guildford and for purposes connected therewith. (Repealed by Farnham Castle Measure 1961 (9 & 10 Eliz. 2. No. 1))
Clergy Pensions (Amendment) Measure 1936	26 Geo. 5 & 1 Edw. 8. No. 1	29 May 1936
A Measure passed by the National Assembly of the Church of England to amend the Clergy Pensions Measures, 1926 to 1928.
Union of Benefices (Amendment) Measure 1936 (repealed)	26 Geo. 5 & 1 Edw. 8. No. 2	29 May 1936
A Measure passed by the National Assembly of the Church of England to amend the Union of Benefices Measure, 1923, and for purposes connected therewith. (Repealed by Pastoral Measure 1968 (No. 1))
Clergy Pensions (Widows and Dependants) Measure 1936	26 Geo. 5 & 1 Edw. 8. No. 3	29 May 1936
A Measure passed by the National Assembly of the Church of England to establish a scheme of pensions for the widows and dependants of the Clergy, and for that purpose to amend the Clergy Pensions Measures, 1926 to 1936.
Cathedrals (Houses of Residence) Measure 1936 (repealed)	26 Geo. 5 & 1 Edw. 8. No. 4	29 May 1936
A Measure passed by the National Assembly of the Church of England to provide for the disposal by sale and otherwise of houses of residence of Deans and Canons of Cathedral Churches or for purposes connected therewith. (Repealed by Cathedrals Measure 1963 (No. 2))
Ecclesiastical Commissioners (Powers) Measure 1936	26 Geo. 5 & 1 Edw. 8. No. 5	29 May 1936
A Measure passed by the National Assembly of the Church of England to confer upon the Ecclesiastical Commissioners temporary power to give financial help for the provision of churches and other buildings for religious worship, and power to make better provision for the endowment of certain bishoprics: to amend and extend the provisions of the Ecclesiastical Leasing Acts: and to amend the Ecclesiastical Commissioners Measure, 1926, (Note: Ecclesiastical Commissioners Measure 1926 (16 & 17 Geo. 5. No. 4)) as to payment by the Ecclesiastical Commissioners of costs of certain legal proceedings.
Queen Anne's Bounty (Powers) Measure 1937	1 Edw. 8 & 1 Geo. 6. No. 1	18 February 1937
A Measure passed by the National Assembly of the Church of England to establish a system of quarterly payments of income payable by Queen Anne's Bounty to incumbents of benefices, and to provide for the transfer to the Ecclesiastical Commissioners of funds held by Queen Anne's Bounty for the benefit of ecclesiastical corporations, and for purposes connected therewith.
House of Laity (Co-opted Members) Measure 1937 (repealed)	1 Edw. 8 & 1 Geo. 6. No. 2	6 May 1937
A Measure passed by the National Assembly of the Church of England to enable the House of Laity to co-opt certain persons to be members of that House. (Repealed by Representation of the Laity Measure 1956 (4 & 5 Eliz. 2. No. 2))
Southwark Cathedral Measure 1937	1 Edw. 8 & 1 Geo. 6. No. 3	1 July 1937
A Measure passed by the National Assembly of the Church of England to establish a Constitution and Statutes for the Cathedral Church of Saint Saviour, Southwark, and for purposes connected therewith.
Marriage (Licensing of Chapels) Measure 1938 (repealed)	1 & 2 Geo. 6. No. 1	13 April 1938
A Measure passed by the National Assembly of the Church of England to remove doubts as to the power of bishops to license chapels in certain districts for the solemnization therein of certain marriages. (Repealed by Marriage Act 1949 (12, 13 & 14 Geo. 6. c. 76))
Guildford Cathedral Measure 1938 (repealed)	1 & 2 Geo. 6. No. 2	13 April 1938
A Measure passed by the National Assembly of the Church of England to transfer the dignity and status of the Cathedral of the Diocese of Guildford from the Church of the Holy Trinity in Guildford to the Church of the Holy Spirit in Guildford and for purposes connected therewith. (Repealed by Guildford Cathedral Measure 1959 (7 & 8 Eliz. 2. No. 3))
Parsonages Measure 1938 (repealed)	1 & 2 Geo. 6. No. 3	23 June 1938
A Measure passed by the National Assembly of the Church of England to consolidate and amend the law relating to the sale, purchase and improvement of parsonage houses and of other property belonging to benefices. (Repealed by Church Property Measure 2018 (No. 8))
Ecclesiastical Commissioners (Powers) Measure 1938	1 & 2 Geo. 6. No. 4	23 June 1938
A Measure passed by the National Assembly of the Church of England to confer upon the Ecclesiastical Commissioners power to establish and fix parochial tables of fees for the performance of church offices and matters incidental thereto: to amend the Glebe Lands Act, 1888, (Note: Glebe Lands Act 1888 (51 & 52 Vict. c. 20)) and to make applicable to future sales under that Act the provisions of the Ecclesiastical Leasing Acts as to improvement of annual value: to give additional powers to the Ecclesiastical Commissioners as to the application of money arising from the sale of property of a benefice under the Ecclesiastical Leasing Acts or the Glebe Lands Act, 1888, and to enable them to rearrange charges on endowment of a benefice in favour of another benefice: to remove a doubt arising under the Union of Benefices Act, 1860: (Note: Union of Benefices Act 1860 (23 & 24 Vict. c. 142)) to enable to Ecclesiastical Commissioners to withdraw certain curate grants: to make provision for payment to the incumbents of benefices by regular quarterly instalments of such part of the income of their respective benefices as is received by them from the Ecclesiastical Commissioners: to give additional powers to the Ecclesiastical Commissioners in relation to funds available for the endowment of benefices and in relation to curate funds: and to amend section two of the Ecclesiastical Commissioners Act, 1850, (Note: Ecclesiastical Commissioners Act 1850 (13 & 14 Vict. c. 94)) as to the salaries payable to the Church Estates Commissioners.
Liverpool City Churches Act 1897 (Amendment) Measure 1938	1 & 2 Geo. 6. No. 5	13 July 1938
A Measure passed by the National Assembly of the Church of England to amend the Liverpool City Churches Act, 1897. (Note: Liverpool City Churches Act 1897 (60 & 61 Vict. c. cxiii))
Faculty Jurisdiction Measure 1938 (repealed)	1 & 2 Geo. 6. No. 6	13 July 1938
A Measure passed by the National Assembly of the Church of England to amend the law relating to the issue of faculties out of ecclesiastical courts; to make better provision for giving effect to faculties so issued; to authorise the sale of books in certain parochial libraries under a faculty; to authorise archdeacons to issue certificates in certain cases; and for other purposes connected therewith. (Repealed by Faculty Jurisdiction Measure 1964 (No. 5))
Queen Anne's Bounty (Powers) Measure 1939	2 & 3 Geo. 6. No. 1	28 April 1939
A Measure passed by the National Assembly of the Church of England to confer upon Queen Anne's Bounty additional powers relating to the application of augmentation moneys and securities, the abatement and extinguishment of charges upon benefices, and other matters connected therewith.
Ecclesiastical Officers Remuneration Measure 1939 (repealed)	2 & 3 Geo. 6. No. 2	28 April 1939
A Measure passed by the National Assembly of the Church of England to provide for the establishment of tables of the fees to be taken by ecclesiastical officers as remuneration for the performance of their duties, including any duties imposed by Measures. (Repealed by Ecclesiastical Fees Measure 1962 (10 & 11 Eliz. 2. No. 1))
Clergy (National Emergency Precautions) Measure 1939 (repealed)	2 & 3 Geo. 6. No. 3	28 July 1939
A Measure passed by the National Assembly of the Church of England to enable the Archbishops of Canterbury and York to make regulations for the more effective exercise of the cure of souls in the event of war, and to enable the Ecclesiastical Commissioners and Queen Anne's Bounty to make financial provision in respect thereof. (Repealed by Statute Law Revision Act 1950 (14 Geo. 6. c. 6))
House of Laity (Postponement of Election) Measure 1939 (repealed)	3 & 4 Geo. 6. No. 1	14 December 1939
A Measure passed by the National Assembly of the Church of England to postpone the election of members of the House of Laity due to be held in the year 1940. (Repealed by Statute Law (Repeals) Act 1977 (c. 18))
Benefice Buildings (Postponement of Inspections and Repayment of Loans) Measure 1940 (repealed)	3 & 4 Geo. 6. No. 2	17 July 1940
A Measure passed by the National Assembly of the Church of England to enable Diocesan Dilapidations Boards to postpone quinquennial inspections of benefice buildings and repayment of loans during a period of emergency and for purposes connected therewith. (Repealed by Statute Law Revision Act 1953 (2 & 3 Eliz. 2. c. 5))
Ecclesiastical Dilapidations (Chancel Repairs) Measure 1940 (repealed)	3 & 4 Geo. 6. No. 3	17 July 1940
A Measure passed by the National Assembly of the Church of England to enable Diocesan Authorities at the request of Parochial Church Councils and with the consent of Queen Anne's Bounty to apply capital moneys in certain cases to the immediate repairs of chancels. (Repealed by Church of England (Miscellaneous Provisions) Measure 2000 (No. 1))
Diocesan Reorganisation Committees Measure 1941 (repealed)	4 & 5 Geo. 6. No. 1	29 July 1941
A Measure passed by the National Assembly of the Church of England to provide for the appointment of Diocesan Reorganisation Committees and to define their powers and duties; to provide for deferring the restoration of damaged churches and parsonage houses, and for suspending the exercise of rights of presentation in certain cases; and to enable the Diocesan Boards of Finance to receive payments under the War Damage Act, 1941. (Note: War Damage Act 1941 (4 & 5 Geo. 6. c. 12)) (Repealed by Pastoral Measure 1968 (No. 1))
Ecclesiastical Commissioners (Powers) Measure 1942 (repealed)	5 & 6 Geo. 6. No. 1	29 April 1942
A Measure passed by the National Assembly of the Church of England to empower the Ecclesiastical Commissioners to pay certain grants on the sole authority of a resolution of the Commissioners. (Repealed by %[%[Church Property (Miscellaneous Provisions) Measure 1960]] (8 & 9 Eliz. 2. No. 1))note4= (Repealed by [[Church Property Measure 2018%]%] (No. 8))
Loans (Postponement of Repayment) Measure 1942 (repealed)	5 & 6 Geo. 6. No. 2	6 August 1942
A Measure passed by the National Assembly of the Church of England to give Queen Anne's Bounty power during a period of emergency to postpone the repayment of principal moneys of loans made by them under certain Acts and Measures and for purposes connected therewith. (Repealed by Statute Law Revision Act 1964 (c. 79))
New Parishes Measure 1943	6 & 7 Geo. 6. No. 1	4 February 1943
A Measure passed by the National Assembly of the Church of England to consolidate with amendments the New Parishes Acts, 1843 to 1884, to repeal such of the provisions of the Church Building Acts, 1818 to 1884, as authorise the formation of new ecclesiastical districts or as are obsolete, and to re-enact with amendments other provisions of the last mentioned Acts, and for purposes connected with the matters aforesaid.
Episcopal Endowments and Stipends Measure 1943	6 & 7 Geo. 6. No. 2	4 February 1943
A Measure passed by the National Assembly of the Church of England to make provision for empowering the Ecclesiastical Commissioners to take over the endowments and property of any see, to pay to the bishop of the diocese an appropriate stipend, to provide for him a suitable residence, to accept responsibility in respect of certain stipends and other official expenses and to deal with any existing house of residence belonging to the see.
Diocesan Education Committees Measure 1943 (repealed)	6 & 7 Geo. 6. No. 3	11 November 1943
A Measure passed by the National Assembly of the Church of England to provide for the appointment of diocesan education committees and to define their powers and duties; to provide for the consultation and co-operation of such committees with the trustees or owners and managers of church schools in regard to such schools; to make provision for the application of moneys received for war damage to church schools; and for purposes connected therewith. (Repealed by Statute Law (Repeals) Act 1986 (c. 12))
Reorganisation Areas Measure 1944 (repealed)	7 & 8 Geo. 6. No. 1	21 March 1944
A Measure passed by the National Assembly of the Church of England to authorise the making of new arrangements for the pastoral supervision of areas which have suffered war damage, or in which, by reason of causes attributable to the war or as a result of planning schemes, material changes in the number or situation of the population have occurred, or are likely to occur, and to amend in certain respects the Diocesan Reorganisation Committees Measure, 1941. (Note: Diocesan Reorganisation Committees Measure 1941 (4 & 5 Geo. 6. No. 1)) (Repealed by Pastoral Measure 1968 (No. 1))
Emergency Legislation Measure 1944 (repealed)	8 & 9 Geo. 6. No. 1	21 December 1944
A Measure passed by the National Assembly of the Church of England to make further provision with respect to the present national emergency. (Repealed by Statute Law Revision Act 1964 (c. 79))
Episcopal Pensions Measure 1945 (repealed)	8 & 9 Geo. 6. No. 2	15 June 1945
A Measure passed by the National Assembly of the Church of England to establish a pension scheme for suffragan bishops; to provide for increased pension contributions by diocesan bishops; to enable provision to be made for the widows of bishops; and to amend in certain respects the existing Measures relating to clergy and episcopal pensions. (Repealed by Clergy Pensions Measure 1961 (9 & 10 Eliz. 2. No. 3))
Incumbents (Disability) Measure 1945	8 & 9 Geo. 6. No. 3	15 June 1945
A Measure passed by the National Assembly of the Church of England to make provision for the cure of souls when through disability arising from age or infirmity (whether bodily or mental) an incumbent of a benefice is unable to discharge adequately the duties attaching thereto and to make provision for payment for the discharge of such duties and for the pension of such incumbent.
Ecclesiastical Commissioners (Curate Grants) Measure 1946	9 & 10 Geo. 6. No. 1	22 May 1946
A Measure passed by the National Assembly of the Church of England to make provision for the transfer to diocesan boards of finance of the administration of sums from the common fund of the Ecclesiastical Commissioners allocated for payments towards the stipends of curates assistant clergy deaconesses and lay helpers, and in connexion therewith to authorise the termination of existing grants payable for the purposes aforesaid.
Clergy Pensions (Supplementary Pensions) Measure 1946	9 & 10 Geo. 6. No. 2	22 May 1946
A Measure passed by the National Assembly of the Church of England to provide for the payment of supplementary pensions to certain persons in receipt of pensions under the Clergy Pensions Measures, 1926 to 1936, and the Clergy Pensions (Older Incumbents) Measure, 1930. (Note: Clergy Pensions (Older Incumbents) Measure 1930 (20 & 21 Geo. 5. No. 6))
Benefices (Suspension of Presentation) Measure 1946	9 & 10 Geo. 6. No. 3	22 May 1946
A Measure passed by the National Assembly of the Church of England to enable the filling of vacancies in benefices to be postponed for certain periods and to make provision for the performance of the ecclesiastical duties, the use of the houses of residence, the management of the property, and the application of the income of the benefices during those periods.
Incumbents (Discipline) Measure 1947 (repealed)	10 & 11 Geo. 6. No. 1	18 February 1947
A Measure passed by the National Assembly of the Church of England to amend the law for the enforcement of Church discipline in the case of incumbents. (Repealed by Ecclesiastical Jurisdiction Measure 1963 (No. 1))
Church Commissioners Measure 1947	10 & 11 Geo. 6. No. 2	2 April 1947
A Measure passed by the National Assembly of the Church of England to promote the more efficient and economical administration of the resources of the Church of England by uniting the Corporation of the Governors of the Bounty of Queen Anne for the augmentation of the maintenance of the poor clergy, founded by charter under the Great Seal in the year 1704, and the Ecclesiastical Commissioners for England originally established in the year 1836 by the statute 6 and 7 William the Fourth, chapter 77. (Note: Ecclesiastical Commissioners Act 1836 (6 & 7 Will. 4. c. 77))
Parsonages (Amendment) Measure 1947 (repealed)	10 & 11 Geo. 6. No. 3	31 July 1947
A Measure passed by the National Assembly of the Church of England to amend the Parsonages Measure, 1938, (Note: Parsonages Measure 1938 (1 & 2 Geo. 6. No. 3)) and for purposes connected therewith. (Repealed by Church Property Measure 2018 (No. 8))
Clergy Pensions Measure 1948 (repealed)	11 & 12 Geo. 6. No. 1	24 March 1948
A Measure passed by the National Assembly of the Church of England to consolidate with amendments, the Clergy Pensions Measures, 1926 to 1946, to limit the application of those Measures to clergy already ordained, to establish a new scheme of pensions for clergy hereafter ordained and their widows and children and to amend the Clergy Pensions (Older Incumbents) Measure, 1930 and for purposes connected therewith. (Repealed by Clergy Pensions Measure 1961 (9 & 10 Eliz. 2. No. 3))
Church Dignitaries (Retirement) Measure 1949	12, 13 & 14 Geo. 6. No. 1	14 July 1949
A Measure passed by the National Assembly of the Church of England to make provision for the retirement of deans, provosts, archdeacons, canons, prebendaries and other church dignitaries if incapacitated by age or physical or mental infirmity, or if guilty of unbecoming conduct or neglect of duty, and for purposes connected with the matters aforesaid.
Parochial Church Councils (Powers) (Amendment) Measure 1949	12, 13 & 14 Geo. 6. No. 2	14 July 1949
A Measure passed by the National Assembly of the Church of England to make further provision with respect to the powers of Parochial Church Councils under the Parochial Church Councils (Powers) Measure, 1921, (Note: Parochial Church Councils (Powers) Measure 1921 (11 & 12 Geo. 5. No. 1)) and to provide for related matters.
Pastoral Reorganisation Measure 1949 (repealed)	12, 13 & 14 Geo. 6. No. 3	14 July 1949
A Measure passed by the National Assembly of the Church of England to make better provision for the cure of souls by simplifying the procedure for the union of benefices and the holding of benefices in plurality, to restrict temporarily the exercise of rights of patronage in certain cases, to provide for the partial diversion of the endowment income of certain benefices, to amend the Pluralities Act, 1838, and the Reorganisation Areas Measure, 1944, (Note: Reorganisation Areas Measure 1944 (7 & 8 Geo. 6. No. 1)) and for purposes connected therewith. (Repealed by Pastoral Measure 1968 (No. 1))
Benefices (Suspension of Presentation) Measure 1946 (Amendment) Measure 1949	12, 13 & 14 Geo. 6. No. 4	16 December 1949
A Measure passed by the National Assembly of the Church of England to amend the Benefices (Suspension of Presentation) Measure, 1946. (Note: Benefices (Suspension of Presentation) Measure 1946 (9 & 10 Geo. 6. No. 3))
Reorganisation Areas Measure 1944 (Amendment) Measure 1949	12, 13 & 14 Geo. 6. No. 5	16 December 1949
A Measure passed by the National Assembly of the Church of England to amend the Reorganisation Areas Measure, 1944.
Incumbents (Discipline) Measure 1947 (Amendment) Measure 1950 (repealed)	14 Geo. 6. No. 1	28 July 1950
A Measure passed by the National Assembly of the Church of England to amend the Incumbents (Discipline) Measure, 1947. (Note: Incumbents (Discipline) Measure 1947 (10 & 11 Geo. 6. No. 1)) (Repealed by Ecclesiastical Jurisdiction Measure 1963 (No. 1))
Diocesan Education Committees Measure 1943 (Amendment) Measure 1951 (repealed)	14 & 15 Geo. 6. No. 1	21 March 1951
A Measure passed by the National Assembly of the Church of England to amend the Diocesan Education Committees Measure, 1943. (Note: Diocesan Education Committees Measure 1943 (6 & 7 Geo. 6. No. 3)) (Repealed by Diocesan Education Committees Measure 1955 (4 & 5 Eliz. 2. No. 1))
Bishops (Retirement) Measure 1951	14 & 15 Geo. 6. No. 2	26 April 1951
A Measure passed by the National Assembly of the Church of England to make provision for the voluntary or compulsory retirement of bishops if incapacitated by physical or mental disability, for voluntary retirement if a change of administration is desirable, and for temporary suspension, censure, or compulsory retirement in case of unbecoming conduct or neglect of duty, and for purposes connected with the matters aforesaid.
Ecclesiastical Dilapidations Measures 1923 to 1929 (Amendment) Measure 1951	14 & 15 Geo. 6. No. 3	22 June 1951
A Measure passed by the National Assembly of the Church of England to amend the Ecclesiastical Dilapidations Measures, 1923 to 1929, by enabling Diocesan Dilapidations Boards to postpone inspections of benefice buildings and to simplify the procedure for authorising payments in respect of repairs in certain cases.
Cathedrals (Appointed Commissions) Measure 1951 (repealed)	14 & 15 Geo. 6. No. 4	22 June 1951
A Measure passed by the National Assembly of the Church of England to empower the Church Commissioners to make payments towards the expenses of commissions appointed pursuant to section 17 of the Cathedrals Measure, 1931. (Repealed by Cathedrals Measure 1963 (No. 2))
Benefices (Stabilization of Incomes) Measure 1951	14 & 15 Geo. 6. No. 5	22 June 1951
A Measure passed by the National Assembly of the Church of England to stabilize income derived by benefices from certain endowments by providing for the transfer of such endowments to the general fund of the Church Commissioners, appropriating sums of money in lieu of the endowments so transferred and charging the general fund of the Commissioners in favour of the benefices concerned; and to amend the Glebe Lands Act, 1888.
Church of England Pensions Board (Powers) Measure 1952 (repealed)	15 & 16 Geo. 6 & 1 Eliz. 2. No. 1	30 April 1952
A Measure passed by The National Assembly of the Church of England to make further provision with respect to the powers of the Church of England Pensions Board and to confer on the Board the status of a housing association and of a trust corporation. (Repealed by Clergy Pensions Measure 1961 (9 & 10 Eliz. 2. No. 3))
Union of Benefices (Disused Churches) Measure 1952 (repealed)	1 & 2 Eliz. 2. No. 1	16 December 1952
A Measure passed by The National Assembly of the Church of England to amend the Union of Benefices Measure, 1923, and for purposes connected therewith. (Repealed by Pastoral Measure 1968 (No. 1))
Diocesan Stipends Funds Measure 1953	1 & 2 Eliz. 2. No. 2	26 March 1953
A Measure passed by the National Assembly of the Church of England to make further provision in relation to diocesan stipends funds established by the Reorganisation Areas Measure, 1944, and the Pastoral Reorganisation Measure, 1949, (Note: Pastoral Reorganisation Measure 1949 (12, 13 & 14 Geo. 6. No. 3)) and for that purpose to amend those Measures and for purposes connected therewith.
Incumbents (Discipline) and Church Dignitaries (Retirement) Amendment Measure 1953 (repealed)	1 & 2 Eliz. 2. No. 3	6 May 1953
A Measure passed by the National Assembly of the Church of England to amend the Incumbents (Discipline) Measure, 1947, and the Church Dignitaries (Retirement) Measure, 1949, (Note: Church Dignitaries (Retirement) Measure 1949 (12, 13 & 14 Geo. 6. No. 1)) in relation to proceedings under those Measures in respect of social or political activities. (Repealed by Ecclesiastical Jurisdiction Measure 1963 (No. 1))
Archdeaconries (Augmentation) Measure 1953	1 & 2 Eliz. 2. No. 4	14 July 1953
A Measure passed by the National Assembly of the Church of England to enable the Church Commissioners to augment archdeaconries by annual sums payable out of their general fund and to repeal the provisions under which archdeaconries may be endowed out of canonries or benefices.
Benefices (Suspension of Presentation) Measure 1953 (repealed)	1 & 2 Eliz. 2. No. 5	29 October 1953
A Measure passed by the National Assembly of the Church of England to extend the duration of the provisions of the Benefices (Suspension of Presentation) Measures, 1946 and 1949, (Note: Benefices (Suspension of Presentation) Measure 1946 (Amendment) Measure 1949 (12, 13 & 14 Geo. 6. No. 4)) and to consolidate those Measures with amendments and for purposes connected therewith. (Repealed by Pastoral Measure 1968 (No. 1))
New Housing Areas (Church Buildings) Measure 1954	2 & 3 Eliz. 2. No. 1	18 March 1954
A Measure passed by the National Assembly of the Church of England to enable the Church Commissioners to make grants or loans in respect of church buildings in certain areas, having regard to recent housing development in those areas and the absence or insufficiency of suitable church buildings therein.
Reorganisation Areas Measure 1944 (Amendment) Measure 1954 (repealed)	2 & 3 Eliz. 2. No. 2	18 March 1954
A Measure passed by the National Assembly of the Church of England to amend the provisions of the Reorganisation Areas Measures, 1944 and 1949, by extending the period of restriction of the exercise of patronage and the period within which proposals for reorganisation schemes may be received. (Repealed by Pastoral Measure 1968 (No. 1))
Cathedrals (Grants) Measure 1954 (repealed)	2 & 3 Eliz. 2. No. 3	18 March 1954
A Measure passed by the National Assembly of the Church of England to enable grants to be made directly to deans, provosts and canons residentiary under section twenty of the Cathedrals Measure, 1931. (Note: Cathedrals Measure 1931 (21 & 22 Geo. 5. No. 7)) (Repealed by Cathedrals Measure 1963 (No. 2))
Clergy Pensions Measure 1954 (repealed)	2 & 3 Eliz. 2. No. 4	30 July 1954
A Measure passed by the National Assembly of the Church of England to provide for making the general fund of the Church Commissioners the source of pensions to Clergy and thereby increasing such pensions, and making them no longer contributory where they have been so, and for purposes connected with the matters aforesaid. (Repealed by Clergy Pensions Measure 1961 (9 & 10 Eliz. 2. No. 3))
Inspection of Churches Measure 1955 (repealed)	3 & 4 Eliz. 2. No. 1	29 March 1955
A Measure passed by the National Assembly of the Church of England to provide for the establishment of schemes for the inspection of churches by architects at least once in every five years; and for purposes connected therewith. (Repealed by Ecclesiastical Jurisdiction and Care of Churches Measure 2018 (No. 3))
Diocesan Education Committees Measure 1955 (repealed)	4 & 5 Eliz. 2. No. 1	21 December 1955
A Measure passed by the National Assembly of the Church of England to consolidate with amendments certain provisions of the Diocesan Education Committees Measure, 1943, and the Diocesan Education Committees Measure, 1943 (Amendment) Measure, 1951; (Note: Diocesan Education Committees Measure 1943 (Amendment) Measure 1951 (14 & 15 Geo. 6. No. 1)) to provide for the validation and continuance of orders made under the provisions of those Measures and for purposes connected therewith. (Repealed by Diocesan Boards of Education Measure 1991 (No. 2))
Representation of the Laity Measure 1956 (repealed)	4 & 5 Eliz. 2. No. 2	5 July 1956
A Measure passed by the National Assembly of the Church of England to amend the Rules for the Representation of the Laity, and in particular, to enlarge the subject matter of the Rules in certain respects. (Repealed by Synodical Government Measure 1969 (No. 2))
Parochial Church Councils (Powers) Measure 1956	4 & 5 Eliz. 2. No. 3	5 July 1956
A Measure passed by the National Assembly of the Church of England to consolidate with amendments certain enactments relating to parochial church councils and parochial charities.
Channel Islands (Church Legislation) Measure 1931 (Amendment) Measure 1957	5 & 6 Eliz. 2. No. 1	17 July 1957
A Measure passed by the National Assembly of the Church of England to amend the Channel Islands (Church Legislation) Measure, 1931. (Note: Channel Islands (Church Legislation) Measure 1931 (21 & 22 Geo. 5. No. 4))
Church Funds Investment Measure 1958	6 & 7 Eliz. 2. No. 1	20 February 1958
A Measure passed by the National Assembly of the Church of England to make better provision for the investment of certain funds of or connected with the Church of England.
Church Schools (Assistance by Church Commissioners) Measure 1958 (repealed)	6 & 7 Eliz. 2. No. 2	20 February 1958
A Measure passed by the National Assembly of the Church of England to enable the Church Commissioners to make payments for the provision of financial assistance for certain church schools; and for purposes connected therewith. (Repealed by Church of England (Miscellaneous Provisions) Measure 2000 (No. 1))
Truro Cathedral Measure 1959	7 & 8 Eliz. 2. No. 1	25 March 1959
A Measure passed by the National Assembly of the Church of England to make further provision for the government of the Cathedral Church of Truro, to repeal the Truro Chapter Act, 1878, (Note: Truro Chapter Act 1878 (41 & 42 Vict. c. 44)) and to repeal the Truro Bishopric and Chapter Acts Amendment Act, 1887, (Note: Truro Bishopric and Chapter Acts Amendment Act 1887 (50 & 51 Vict. c. 12)) and to re-enact with amendments certain of its provisions.
Vacancies in Sees Measure 1959	7 & 8 Eliz. 2. No. 2	25 March 1959
A Measure passed by the National Assembly of the Church of England to enable the guardian of the spiritualities of a see to act during a vacancy thereof in place of the bishop for the purposes of certain enactments and for purposes connected therewith.
Guildford Cathedral Measure 1959	7 & 8 Eliz. 2. No. 3	25 March 1959
A Measure passed by the National Assembly of the Church of England to transfer the dignity and status of the Cathedral of the Diocese of Guildford from the Church of the Holy Trinity in Guildford to the Church of the Holy Spirit in Guildford, to constitute a Dean and Chapter of the Cathedral Church, to make provision for the government of the Cathedral Church and for purposes connected therewith.
Church Property (Miscellaneous Provisions) Measure 1960	8 & 9 Eliz. 2. No. 1	13 April 1960
A Measure passed by the National Assembly of the Church of England to amend the Parsonages Measure, 1938, and the New Parishes Measure, 1943, (Note: New Parishes Measure 1943 (6 & 7 Geo. 6. No. 1)) and to make further provision as to church land; to make further provision as to grants and payments by the Church Commissioners; to provide for the distribution of the tithe maintenance fund; to alter the title of the Church Estates Commissioner appointed by the Archbishop of Canterbury, to transfer to the Church Commissioners the property and certain functions of the Church Estates Commissioners and to make provision as to the pensions of the Church Estates Commissioners; to enable certain suffragan bishops to receive augmentation from the Clergy Pensions Institution; to provide for the transfer of rights of patronage within twelve months from the last institution or admission to the benefice; to abolish certain restrictions in respect of assurances of property to diocesan authorities; to dispense with the publication in the London Gazette of Orders in Council confirming schemes of the Church Commissioners; and for purposes connected with the matters aforesaid.
Farnham Castle Measure 1961	9 & 10 Eliz. 2. No. 1	2 March 1961
A Measure passed by the National Assembly of the Church of England to vest part of Farnham Castle in the Church Commissioners and to make provision for their powers in relation to the whole of Farnham Castle.
Baptismal Registers Measure 1961	9 & 10 Eliz. 2. No. 2	3 August 1961
A Measure passed by the National Assembly of the Church of England to provide for the annotation of parochial registers of baptisms in cases of persons legitimated after baptism, and for the issue of short certificates of baptism in certain cases, and for purposes connected with the matters aforesaid.
Clergy Pensions Measure 1961	9 & 10 Eliz. 2. No. 3	3 August 1961
A Measure passed by the National Assembly of the Church of England to consolidate with amendments the Acts of Parliament and Measures of the Church Assembly relating to pensions for clergy and their widows and dependants and to the powers of the Church of England Pensions Board; to provide for increases in the pensions payable to clergy and for making the pensions payable to bishops no longer contributory; to provide for pensions which are not contributory for certain widows of clergy; to confer on the Church of England Pensions Board power to provide homes of residence for retired church workers and their wives and for the widows and dependants of deceased church workers; and for purposes connected with the matters aforesaid.
Ecclesiastical Fees Measure 1962	10 & 11 Eliz. 2. No. 1	3 July 1962
A Measure passed by the National Assembly of the Church of England to make further provision for the establishment of tables of ecclesiastical fees, to relieve certain clerks in Holy Orders from the liability to pay certain fees and for purposes connected therewith.
Ecclesiastical Jurisdiction Measure 1963	1963 No. 1	31 July 1963
A Measure passed by The National Assembly of the Church of England to reform and reconstruct the system of ecclesiastical courts of the Church of England, to replace with new provisions the existing enactments relating to ecclesiastical discipline, to abolish certain obsolete jurisdictions and fees, and for purposes connected therewith.
Cathedrals Measure 1963	1963 No. 2	31 July 1963
A Measure passed by the National Assembly of the Church of England to replace with new provisions the Cathedral Measures 1931 and 1934, (Note: Cathedrals (Amendment) Measure 1934 (24 & 25 Geo. 5. No. 3)) and other enactments relating to cathedral churches; to repeal certain obsolete provisions relating to cathedral churches or to churches which are or have been collegiate churches; and for purposes connected therewith.
Church Commissioners (Loans for Theological Colleges and Training Houses) Measure 1964	1964 No. 1	27 February 1964
A Measure passed by the National Assembly of the Church of England to enable the Church Commissioners to make or guarantee loans to defray capital expenditure in connection with establishments for the training of men for the Ministry and of women for work in connection with the cure of souls.
Incumbents and Churchwardens (Trusts) Measure 1964	1964 No. 2	27 February 1964
A Measure passed by the National Assembly of the Church of England to vest certain real and personal property held, acquired or administered upon charitable ecclesiastical trusts by incumbents and churchwardens jointly or severally and certain ecclesiastical corporations, in the diocesan authority and for purposes connected therewith.
Churchwardens (Appointment and Resignation) Measure 1964 (repealed)	1964 No. 3	27 February 1964
A Measure passed by the National Assembly of the Church of England to regulate the number and qualifications of, and the time and manner of choosing, churchwardens of parishes; to regulate their admission to office; to provide for the resignation of churchwardens and for their vacating their offices in certain events; to regulate the qualifications of churchwardens of Guild Churches in the City of London; and for purposes connected therewith. (Repealed by Churchwardens Measure 2001 (No. 1))
Holy Table Measure 1964 (repealed)	1964 No. 4	15 April 1964
A Measure passed by the National Assembly of the Church of England to enable the Holy Table in a Church or Chapel to be immovable and to be made of any suitable material. (Repealed by Church of England (Worship and Doctrine) Measure 1974 (No. 3))
Faculty Jurisdiction Measure 1964 (repealed)	1964 No. 5	15 April 1964
A Measure passed by the National Assembly of the Church of England to enable ecclesiastical courts to vest privately owned parts of churches in the persons in whom the churches are vested; to amend the law relating to the issue of faculties out of such courts concerning the demolition of churches and works affecting monuments in private ownership; to empower bishops to make certain licensed chapels subject to the faculty jurisdiction of such courts; to declare the law relating to the jurisdiction of such courts over the curtilage of churches; to limit the duration of rights of sepulture; to make better provision for the enforcement of orders as to costs and expenses; to repeal and re-enact the Faculty Jurisdiction Measure 1938, (Note: Faculty Jurisdiction Measure 1938 (1 & 2 Geo. 6. No. 6)) with amendments; and for other purposes connected therewith. (Repealed by Ecclesiastical Jurisdiction and Care of Churches Measure 2018 (No. 3))
Clergy (Ordination and Miscellaneous Provisions) Measure 1964	1964 No. 6	10 June 1964
A Measure passed by the National Assembly of the Church of England to amend the law relating to the qualifications for Holy Orders and to the Form and Manner of Making, Ordaining and Consecrating Bishops, Priests and Deacons; and to amend the law relating to the revocation of licences granted to Ministers and to the occupations of Ministers.
Vestures of Ministers Measure 1964 (repealed)	1964 No. 7	31 July 1964
A Measure passed by the National Assembly of the Church of England to regulate the vestures to be worn by Ministers at the times of their ministrations. (Repealed by Church of England (Worship and Doctrine) Measure 1974 (No. 3))
Church Commissioners Measure 1964	1964 No. 8	31 July 1964
A Measure passed by the National Assembly of the Church of England to amend the Church Commissioners Measure 1947 (Note: Church Commissioners Measure 1947 (10 & 11 Geo. 6. No. 2)) and certain other provisions relating to the Estates and Finance Committee and the Church Estates Commissioners.
Prayer Book (Alternative and Other Services) Measure 1965 (repealed)	1965 No. 1	23 March 1965
A Measure passed by the National Assembly of the Church of England to authorise the use by way of experiment of alternative forms of Service deviating from the Book of Common Prayer and the use of forms of Service for use on special occasions; and to authorise minor variations in public prayer and for purposes connected therewith. (Repealed by Church of England (Worship and Doctrine) Measure 1974 (No. 3))
Benefices (Suspension of Presentation) (Continuance) Measure 1965 (repealed)	1965 No. 2	2 June 1965
A Measure passed by the National Assembly of the Church of England to extend the duration of section 1 of the Benefices (Suspension of Presentation) Measure 1953. (Note: Benefices (Suspension of Presentation) Measure 1953 (1 & 2 Eliz. 2. No. 5)) (Repealed by Pastoral Measure 1968 (No. 1))
Prayer Book (Miscellaneous Provisions) Measure 1965 (repealed)	1965 No. 3	5 August 1965
A Measure passed by the National Assembly of the Church of England to authorise the approval of days of Special Observance; to enable a Bishop to authorise a Minister to dispense with the reading of Morning and Evening Prayer on certain days; to amend the rubrics at the beginning and end of the Communion Service in the Book of Common Prayer; and to extend the right to use the Book of Common Prayer in Latin to all universities and certain other places of learning. (Repealed by Church of England (Worship and Doctrine) Measure 1974 (No. 3))
Prayer Book (Versions of the Bible) Measure 1965	1965 No. 4	22 December 1965
A Measure passed by the National Assembly of the Church of England to permit the use of any version of the Bible authorised by the Convocations with the concurrence of the House of Laity for portions of Scripture appointed to be read, said or sung in the Book of Common Prayer, and for purposes connected therewith.
Clergy Pensions (Amendment) Measure 1967 (repealed)	1967 No. 1	22 March 1967
A Measure passed by the National Assembly of the Church of England to amend the Clergy Pensions Measure 1961. (Note: Clergy Pensions Measure 1961 (9 & 10 Eliz. 2. No. 3)) (Repealed by Church of England Pensions Measure 2018 (No. 9))
Extra-Parochial Ministry Measure 1967	1967 No. 2	14 July 1967
A Measure passed by the National Assembly of the Church of England to authorise the Minister of a parish to exercise his ministry outside the parish for the benefit of persons on the electoral roll of the parish: and for licensing a Minister to exercise his ministry at or for the benefit of an institution without the consent of and without being subject to the control of the Minister of the parish.
Overseas and Other Clergy (Ministry and Ordination) Measure 1967	1967 No. 3	14 July 1967
A Measure passed by the National Assembly of the Church of England to make better provision for permitting overseas clergymen and certain other clergymen to exercise their ministry in the provinces of Canterbury and York, for enabling overseas bishops and certain other bishops to exercise episcopal functions in the said provinces, for the ordination of clergymen for ministry overseas, and for matters connected with the matters aforesaid.
Pastoral Measure 1968 (repealed)	1968 No. 1	30 May 1968
A Measure passed by The National Assembly of the Church of England to make better provision for the cure of souls and for the use, preservation or disposal of redundant churches, to amend the law relating to pluralities, to enable certain pastoral functions of bishops relating to property to be delegated, and for purposes connected with the matters aforesaid. (Repealed by Pastoral Measure 1983 (No. 1))
Prayer Book (Further Provisions) Measure 1968	1968 No. 2	18 December 1968
A Measure passed by the National Assembly of the Church of England to make further provision for amending the Book of Common Prayer and certain enactments relating to that Book and to the burial service.
Clergy Pensions (Amendment) Measure 1969	1969 No. 1	25 July 1969
A Measure passed by the National Assembly of the Church of England to amend the Clergy Pensions Measure 1961 in respect of the entitlement to pension and rate of pension of clerks in Holy Orders who retire before the retiring age.
Synodical Government Measure 1969	1969 No. 2	25 July 1969
A Measure passed by The National Assembly of the Church of England to provide for the vesting by Canon of the functions, authority, rights and privileges of the Convocations of Canterbury and York in the General Synod of the Church of England, and for the modification by Canon of the functions of the said Convocations when sitting separately for their provinces; to rename and reconstitute the Church Assembly as the General Synod, and to make further provision for the synodical government of the Church of England, and for purposes connected with the matters aforesaid.
Collegiate Churches (Capital Endowments) Measure 1970	1970 No. 1	24 March 1970
A Measure passed by the National Assembly of the Church of England to provide capital endowments for the Collegiate Churches of St. Peter in Westminster and St. George, Windsor.
Sharing of Church Buildings Measure 1970	1970 No. 2	24 March 1970
A Measure passed by The National Assembly of the Church of England to extend the Pastoral Measure 1968 (Note: Pastoral Measure 1968 (No. 1)) for the purpose of authorising sharing agreements in respect of consecrated churches and parsonage houses, and to provide for other matters arising out of the sharing of church buildings by the Church of England.
Church Commissioners Measure 1970	1970 No. 3	17 December 1970
A Measure passed by the National Assembly of the Church of England to provide for the appointment of Church Commissioners as additional members of the General Purposes Committee and the Assets Committee of the Church Commissioners.
Synodical Government (Special Majorities) Measure 1971	1971 No. 1	17 February 1971
A Measure passed by the National Assembly of the Church of England to authorise the General Synod of the Church of England to require special majorities for a scheme for a constitutional union or a permanent and substantial change of relationship between the Church of England and another Christian body, and for the exercise of powers to suspend the Standing Orders of the General Synod.
Admission to Holy Communion Measure 1972 (repealed)	1972 No. 1	10 February 1972
A Measure passed by the General Synod of the Church of England to provide for admission to the Holy Communion. (Repealed by Statute Law (Repeals) Measure 2018 (No. 1))
Repair of Benefice Buildings Measure 1972	1972 No. 2	10 February 1972
A Measure passed by the General Synod of the Church of England to provide for the repair of parsonage houses by Parsonages Boards and for the repair of other buildings belonging to a benefice; to make other provision for repairs and other works and matters relating to church buildings and land; and for purposes connected therewith.
Benefices Measure 1972	1972 No. 3	10 February 1972
A Measure passed by the General Synod of the Church of England to provide an additional ground for refusing to institute or admit a presentee to a benefice, and for purposes connected therewith.
Deaconesses and Lay Ministry Measure 1972	1972 No. 4	9 August 1972
A Measure passed by the General Synod of the Church of England to enable further provision to be made by Canon with respect to the ministry of deaconesses, licensed lay workers, readers and other lay persons.
Clergy Pensions (Amendment) Measure 1972 (repealed)	1972 No. 5	9 August 1972
A Measure passed by the General Synod of the Church of England to Amend the Clergy Pensions Measures 1961 to 1969. (Repealed by Church of England Pensions Measure 2018 (No. 9))
Synodical Government (Amendment) Measure 1974	1974 No. 1	9 July 1974
A Measure passed by the General Synod of the Church of England to make provision for the amendment of the Constitutions of the Convocations of Canterbury and York; to amend Article 8 of the Constitution of the General Synod of the Church of England; and to make further provision with respect to the manner of voting in the General Synod.
Ecclesiastical Jurisdiction (Amendment) Measure 1974	1974 No. 2	9 July 1974
A Measure passed by The General Synod of the Church of England to amend the Ecclesiastical Jurisdiction Measure 1963. (Note: Ecclesiastical Jurisdiction Measure 1963 (No. 1))
Church of England (Worship and Doctrine) Measure 1974	1974 No. 3	12 December 1974
A Measure passed by the General Synod of the Church of England to enable provision to be made by Canon with respect to worship in the Church of England and other matters prescribed by the Book of Common Prayer, and with respect to the obligations and forms of assent or subscription to the doctrine of the Church of England; to repeal enactments relating to the matters aforesaid; and for purposes connected therewith.
Church Commissioners (Miscellaneous Provisions) Measure 1975	1975 No. 1	1 August 1975
A Measure passed by the General Synod of the Church of England to make provision for empowering the Church Commissioners to make payments towards the stipend and expenses of the Bishop of Sodor and Man and to make further provision with respect to the pensions of Church Estates Commissioners and their widows.
Ecclesiastical Offices (Age Limit) Measure 1975	1975 No. 2	1 August 1975
A Measure passed by the General Synod of the Church of England to make provision with respect to the age limit for the holding of certain ecclesiastical offices.
Cathedrals Measure 1976	1976 No. 1	25 March 1976
A Measure passed by the General Synod of the Church of England to make fresh provision with respect to the revision of the constitution and statutes of cathedral churches; and to amend section 42 of the Cathedrals Measure 1963. (Note: Cathedrals Measure 1963 (No. 2))
Ecclesiastical Judges and Legal Officers Measure 1976 (repealed)	1976 No. 2	25 March 1976
A Measure passed by the General Synod of the Church of England to regulate the age of retirement from the office of judge of an ecclesiastical court; to make provision for limiting the number of chancellorships to be held by one person; to make fresh provision with respect to the other legal officers of the Church of England; and for purposes connected with the matters aforesaid. (Repealed by Ecclesiastical Jurisdiction and Care of Churches Measure 2018 (No. 3))
Church of England (Miscellaneous Provisions) Measure 1976	1976 No. 3	15 November 1976
A Measure passed by the General Synod of the Church of England to enable provision to be made by Canon with respect to certain declarations made and subscribed and other matters required on ordination and admission to office in the Church of England and to repeal the enactments relating to those matters; to enable provision to be made by Canon with respect to licensing of assistant curates for fixed terms; to replace section 85 of the Pastoral Measure 1968; to dispense with periodical episcopal visitations of cathedrals; to amend section 1 of the Benefices (Sequestrations) Measure 1933; (Note: Benefices (Sequestrations) Measure 1933 (23 & 24 Geo. 5. No. 4)) to amend the law relating to the burial of certain persons in parish burial grounds; to repeal section 13 of the Burnley Rectory Act 1890; (Note: Burnley Rectory Act 1890 (53 & 54 Vict. c. cxxiii)) and for purposes connected with the matters aforesaid.
Endowments and Glebe Measure 1976	1976 No. 4	22 November 1976
A Measure passed by the General Synod of the Church of England to make fresh provision with respect to the means by which the clergy and certain lay persons engaged in the cure of souls are remunerated; to transfer glebe land to Diocesan Boards of Finance; to make provision with respect to the powers and duties of such Boards in relation to such land; to restrict the letting of parts of parsonage houses and to make other provision with respect to such houses; to amend the Diocesan Stipends Funds Measure 1953; (Note: Diocesan Stipends Funds Measure 1953 (1 & 2 Eliz. 2. No. 2)) to amend the law relating to sequestrations; to amend the law relating to the liability to repair certain chancels; and for purposes connected with the matters aforesaid.
Incumbents (Vacation of Benefices) Measure 1977	1977 No. 1	30 June 1977
A Measure passed by the General Synod of the Church of England to make provision, including provision for the vacation of the benefice, where there has been a serious breakdown of the pastoral relationship between an incumbent and his parishioners or where an incumbent is unable by reason of age or infirmity to discharge adequately the duties attaching to his benefice, and for purposes connected therewith.
Dioceses Measure 1978 (repealed)	1978 No. 1	2 February 1978
A Measure passed by the General Synod of the Church of England to make provision for enabling alterations to be made in the diocesan structure of the provinces of Canterbury and York; to make further provision for enabling certain functions of diocesan bishops to be discharged by suffragan bishops; to abolish the power to commission suffragan bishops; to make provision for constituting separate synods for areas of a diocese; to make further provision with respect to the nomination of suffragan bishops; to make provision with respect to the discharge of the functions of certain diocesan bodies; and for purposes connected with those matters. (Repealed by Dioceses, Pastoral and Mission Measure 2007 (No. 1))
Parochial Registers and Records Measure 1978	1978 No. 2	2 February 1978
A Measure passed by the General Synod of the Church of England to consolidate with amendments certain enactments relating to the registration of baptisms and burials and to repeal some of those enactments without re-enactment; to make fresh provision in place of the Parochial Registers and Records Measure 1929 (Note: Parochial Registers and Records Measure 1929 (19 & 20 Geo. 5. No. 1)) with respect to diocesan record offices, the deposit therein of certain parochial registers and other records in ecclesiastical custody and the care of such registers and records; and for purposes connected therewith.
Church of England (Miscellaneous Provisions) Measure 1978	1978 No. 3	30 June 1978
A Measure passed by the General Synod of the Church of England to make further provision with respect to the special majorities required for the final approval of certain Measures; to make further provision with respect to the continuance in certain offices of persons in office at the commencement of the Ecclesiastical Offices (Age Limit) Measure 1975; (Note: Ecclesiastical Offices (Age Limit) Measure 1975 (No. 2)) to make provision for altering the financial year of the Church Commissioners; to amend Schedule 1 to the Church Commissioners Measure 1947; to provide for an additional member of diocesan boards of finance; to amend section 20 of the Parochial Registers and Records Measure 1978; (Note: Parochial Registers and Records Measure 1978 (No. 2)) to extend section 17 of the New Parishes Measure 1943; to make provision for facilitating the conveyance of ecclesiastical property in certain circumstances; to make provision for extending the Inspection of Churches Measure 1955 (Note: Inspection of Churches Measure 1955 (3 & 4 Eliz. 2. No. 1)) and schemes made thereunder; to amend section 43 of the Cathedrals Measure 1963 and sections 3 and 43 of the Endowments and Glebe Measure 1976; (Note: Endowments and Glebe Measure 1976 (No. 4)) to repeal so much of section 21 of the Queen Anne's Bounty Act 1714 (Note: Queen Anne's Bounty Act 1714 (1 Geo. 1. St. 2. c. 10)) as requires certain documents to be enrolled in the High Court.
Deaconesses and Lay Workers (Pensions) Measure 1980 (repealed)	1980 No. 1	20 March 1980
A Measure passed by the General Synod of the Church of England to empower the Church Commissioners to make payments for the provision or augmentation of pensions and related benefits for deaconesses, lay workers, their dependants and widows; and for purposes connected therewith. (Repealed by Church of England Pensions Measure 2018 (No. 9))
Diocese in Europe Measure 1980	1980 No. 2	30 June 1980
A Measure passed by the General Synod of the Church of England to make provision for the representation in the General Synod of the Church of England of the diocese of Gibraltar in Europe when established; to amend Article 8 of the Constitution of the General Synod in relation to the said diocese; to empower the Church Commissioners to pay to the bishop and any suffragan bishop of the said diocese when established a stipend and his official expenses and to provide or assist with the provision of suitable residences for such bishops; to confer pension rights on bishops and other clergy who perform ecclesiastical service in the said diocese after its establishment; to extend the Deaconesses and Lay Workers (Pensions) Measure 1980 (Note: Deaconesses and Lay Workers (Pensions) Measure 1980 (No. 1)) to the said diocese; and to amend the Overseas and Other Clergy (Ministry and Ordination) Measure 1967. (Note: Overseas and Other Clergy (Ministry and Ordination) Measure 1967 (No. 3))
Pastoral (Amendment) Measure 1982 (repealed)	1982 No. 1	23 July 1982
A Measure passed by the General Synod of the Church of England to amend the Pastoral Measure 1968 and make provision for enabling that Measure to be extended to the Isle of Man, to make provision for enabling a new body to be established to replace the Advisory Body for Redundant Churches and the Redundant Churches Fund and to amend section 5(3) of the Parsonages Measure 1938. (Repealed by Pastoral Measure 1983 (No. 1))
Clergy Pensions (Amendment) Measure 1982 (repealed)	1982 No. 2	23 July 1982
A Measure passed by the General Synod of the Church of England to amend sections 17 and 26 of the Clergy Pensions Measure 1961; to make further provision with respect to the membership of pensions schemes for church workers and with respect to the investment of moneys comprised in certain pension funds established by the Church of England Pensions Board; and for purposes connected with the matters aforesaid. (Repealed by Church of England Pensions Measure 2018 (No. 9))
Pastoral Measure 1983 (repealed)	1983 No. 1	9 May 1983
A Measure passed by The General Synod of The Church of England to consolidate with minor amendments the Pastoral Measure 1968, the Pastoral (Amendment) Measure 1982 (Note: Pastoral (Amendment) Measure 1982 (No. 1)) and related enactments, which are designed to make better provision for the cure of souls. (Repealed by Mission and Pastoral Measure 2011 (No. 3))
Church of England (Miscellaneous Provisions) Measure 1983	1983 No. 2	9 May 1983
A Measure passed by The General Synod of the Church of England to amend the New Parishes Measure 1943, the Parsonages Measure 1938, the Parochial Church Councils (Powers) Measure 1956, (Note: Parochial Church Councils (Powers) Measure 1956 (4 & 5 Eliz. 2. No. 3)) the Ecclesiastical Judges and Legal Officers Measure 1976, (Note: Ecclesiastical Judges and Legal Officers Measure 1976 (No. 2)) and the Bishops (Retirement) Measure 1951; (Note: Bishops (Retirement) Measure 1951 (14 & 15 Geo. 6. No. 2)) to make further provision with respect to the discharge of the functions of a bishop or archdeacon and the constitution of an Appeal Tribunal for the compensation of clergy; and to make provision for transferring a house and muniment room in Lichfield from the Registrar of Lichfield to the Diocesan Board of Finance; and for purposes connected therewith.
Bishops (Retirement) Measure 1986	1986 No. 1	18 March 1986
A Measure passed by the General Synod of the Church of England to make fresh provision with respect to the resignation or retirement of archbishops and bishops and for purposes connected therewith.
Ecclesiastical Fees Measure 1986	1986 No. 2	18 March 1986
A Measure passed by the General Synod of the Church of England to make further provision with respect to ecclesiastical fees and for purposes connected therewith.
Patronage (Benefices) Measure 1986	1986 No. 3	18 July 1986
A Measure passed by the General Synod of the Church of England to amend the law relating to patronage of benefices.
Deacons (Ordination of Women) Measure 1986	1986 No. 4	7 November 1986
A Measure passed by the General Synod of the Church of England to make provision for the ordination of women as deacons, and for connected purposes.
Church of England (Legal Aid and Miscellaneous Provisions) Measure 1988	1988 No. 1	9 February 1988
A Measure passed by the General Synod of the Church of England to make further provision concerning legal aid; to enable marriages of housebound and detained persons to be solemnized by persons licensed under the Extra-Parochial Ministry Measure 1967; (Note: Extra-Parochial Ministry Measure 1967 (No. 2)) to make provision for the change of name of a see; to enable further provision to be made by Canon with respect to licences granted to ministers, deaconesses, lay workers and readers; to make provision with respect to the appointment of organists and choirmasters; to amend section 31 of the Leasehold Reform Act 1967, (Note: Leasehold Reform Act 1967 (c. 88)) section 7 of the Parochial Church Councils (Powers) Measure 1956, section 7 of the Church Property (Miscellaneous Provisions) Measure 1960, (Note: Church Property (Miscellaneous Provisions) Measure 1960 (8 & 9 Eliz. 2. No. 1)) and section 3 of the Pastoral Measure 1983; (Note: Pastoral Measure 1983 (No. 1)) to amend provisions of the Clergy Pensions Measure 1961 relating to the Clergy (Widows and Dependants) Fund; and for connected purposes.
Church Commissioners (Assistance for Priority Areas) Measure 1988	1988 No. 2	3 May 1988
A Measure passed by The General Synod of the Church of England to extend the power of the Church Commissioners to make grants or loans in respect of church buildings in certain areas which are not sufficiently supplied with suitable church buildings and to enable the Church Commissioners to make grants or loans to the Church Urban Fund.
Church of England (Ecumenical Relations) Measure 1988	1988 No. 3	29 July 1988
A Measure passed by the General Synod of the Church of England to enable provision to be made by Canon with respect to local co-operation between the Church of England and other Churches; to modify in certain cases restrictions imposed by the Overseas and Other Clergy (Ministry and Ordination) Measure 1967; and for connected purposes.
Church of England (Pensions) Measure 1988	1988 No. 4	27 October 1988
A Measure passed by the General Synod of the Church of England to amend the Clergy Pensions Measures 1961 to 1982, and for connected purposes.
Clergy (Ordination) Measure 1990	1990 No. 1	22 February 1990
A Measure passed by the General Synod of the Church of England to amend the law relating to impediments to admission into Holy Orders.
Care of Cathedrals Measure 1990 (repealed)	1990 No. 2	26 July 1990
A Measure passed by the General Synod of the Church of England to make further provision for the care and conservation of cathedral churches. (Repealed by Care of Cathedrals Measure 2011 (No. 1))
Care of Churches and Ecclesiastical Jurisdiction Measure 1991	1991 No. 1	25 July 1991
A Measure passed by the General Synod of the Church of England to make provision as to the care of churches and the lands and articles appertaining thereto and of documents of historic interest to the Church of England; to amend the law relating to the inspection of churches; to amend the law relating to ecclesiastical courts, commissions, judges and registrars; to make further provision as to the grant of faculties; to enable bishops to remove the legal effects of consecration; to repeal section 4 of the Parish Notices Act 1837; (Note: Parish Notices Act 1837 (7 Will. 4 & 1 Vict. c. 45)) and for purposes connected therewith.
Diocesan Boards of Education Measure 1991	1991 No. 2	25 July 1991 (Note: The Queen's Printer edition erroneously states that royal assent was given on 12 July 1991, but the Journals of the House of Commons confirm that it was in fact given on 25 July 1991.)
A Measure passed by the General Synod of the Church of England to make provision as to Diocesan Boards of Education.
Church of England (Miscellaneous Provisions) Measure 1992	1992 No. 1	6 March 1992
A Measure passed by the General Synod of the Church of England to amend the law relating to sequestration; to make further provision with respect to the appointment of new patrons; to make further provision with respect to the conduct of funeral services and rights of burial; to enable parochial church councils to hold advowsons; to amend the law relating to the resignation of incumbents; to amend the law relating to the tenure of office of diocesan chancellors and registrars; to clarify the law relating to archdeacons' visitations; to clarify the law relating to the appointment of rural deans; to amend the law relating to the appointment of canons in cathedral churches; to amend section 27 of the Cemeteries Clauses Act 1847, (Note: Cemeteries Clauses Act 1847 (10 & 11 Vict. c. 65)) section 11 of the Benefices Act 1898, sections 13, 16 and 17 of the New Parishes Measure 1943, section 5 of and the First Schedule to the Church Commissioners Measure 1947, sections 4 and 5 of the Diocesan Stipends Funds Measure 1953, section 12 of the Cathedrals Measure 1963, sections 55 and 56 of the Ecclesiastical Jurisdiction Measure 1963, section 1 of the Benefices Measure 1972, (Note: Benefices Measure 1972 (No. 3)) sections 3, 4 and 5 of the Cathedrals Measure 1976, (Note: Cathedrals Measure 1976 (No. 1)) sections 20, 23, 24 and 38 of the Endowments and Glebe Measure 1976, the Parochial Registers and Records Measure 1978, section 2 of the Dioceses Measure 1978, (Note: Dioceses Measure 1978 (No. 1)) sections 29, 54 and 68 of and Schedules 4, 6 and 7 to the Pastoral Measure 1983, section 9 of and Schedule 2 to the Patronage (Benefices) Measure 1986 (Note: Patronage (Benefices) Measure 1986 (No. 3)) and section 5 of the Church of England (Ecumenical Relations) Measure 1988; (Note: Church of England (Ecumenical Relations) Measure 1988 (No. 3)) to repeal certain enactments which are no longer of practical utility; and for purposes connected therewith.
Incumbents (Vacation of Benefices) (Amendment) Measure 1993	1993 No. 1	27 July 1993
A Measure passed by the General Synod of the Church of England to amend the Incumbents (Vacation of Benefices) Measure 1977. (Note: Incumbents (Vacation of Benefices) Measure 1977 (No. 1))
Priests (Ordination of Women) Measure 1993 (repealed)	1993 No. 2	5 November 1993
A Measure passed by the General Synod of the Church of England to make provision for the ordination of women as priests, and for connected purposes. (Repealed by Bishops and Priests (Consecration and Ordination of Women) Measure 2014 (No. 2))
Ordination of Women (Financial Provisions) Measure 1993	1993 No. 3	5 November 1993
A Measure passed by the General Synod of the Church of England to make provision as to the relief of hardship incurred by persons resigning from ecclesiastical service by reason of opposition to the ordination of women as priests, and for connected purposes.
Pastoral (Amendment) Measure 1994 (repealed)	1994 No. 1	24 March 1994
A Measure passed by the General Synod of the Church of England to amend the Pastoral Measure 1983, in so far as it relates to redundant buildings and land annexed or belonging thereto, in connection with financial matters, with the removal of the legal effects of consecration, with the discharge and modification of covenants and with the annual report of the Advisory Board for Redundant Churches; and to provide a new name for the Redundant Churches Fund. (Repealed by Mission and Pastoral Measure 2011 (No. 3))
Care of Cathedrals (Supplementary Provisions) Measure 1994 (repealed)	1994 No. 2	21 July 1994
A Measure passed by the General Synod of the Church of England to make further provision in connection with the care and conservation of cathedral churches. (Repealed by Care of Cathedrals Measure 2011 (No. 1))
Church of England (Legal Aid) Measure 1994	1994 No. 3	21 July 1994
A Measure passed by the General Synod of the Church of England to consolidate with amendments the provisions concerning legal aid contained in the Church of England (Legal Aid and Miscellaneous Provisions) Measure 1988. (Note: Church of England (Legal Aid and Miscellaneous Provisions) Measure 1988 (No. 1))
Team and Group Ministries Measure 1995	1995 No. 1	28 June 1995
A Measure passed by the General Synod of the Church of England to make further provision with respect to team and group ministries.
Church of England (Miscellaneous Provisions) Measure 1995	1995 No. 2	19 July 1995
A Measure passed by the General Synod of the Church of England to make it lawful for Church of Ireland ministers to officiate in England; to provide for the appointment of lay canons in the Cathedral Church of Christ in Oxford; to enable the designation of archdeacon emeritus to be conferred; to amend the law relating to the resignation of deans, residentiary canons and archdeacons; to amend section 27 of the Ecclesiastical Commissioners Act 1840, section 6 of the Church Commissioners Measure 1947, the Schedule to the Church Funds Investment Measure 1958, (Note: Church Funds Investment Measure 1958 (6 & 7 Eliz. 2. No. 1)) section 21 of the Clergy Pensions Measure 1961, sections 2, 3 and 27 of and Schedule 1 to the Ecclesiastical Jurisdiction Measure 1963, section 20 of the Parochial Registers and Records Measure 1978, sections 9, 44, 51 and 87 of and Schedule 1 to the Pastoral Measure 1983, section 8 of the Church of England (Miscellaneous Provisions) Measure 1983 (Note: Church of England (Miscellaneous Provisions) Measure 1983 (No. 2)) and section 6 of the Care of Churches and Ecclesiastical Jurisdiction Measure 1991; (Note: Care of Churches and Ecclesiastical Jurisdiction Measure 1991 (No. 1)) to amend certain enactments in connection with the procedure of the General Synod; and for purposes connected therewith.
Pensions Measure 1997	1997 No. 1	21 March 1997
A Measure passed by the General Synod of the Church of England to make further provision in relation to pensions and related benefits for certain persons who are or have been in the service of the Church of England and their widows, widowers and dependants.
National Institutions Measure 1998	1998 No. 1	2 July 1998
A Measure passed by the General Synod of the Church of England to make better provision for the establishment and functions of the national institutions of the Church of England and for the management of the assets thereof; and for purposes connected therewith.
Cathedrals Measure 1999	1999 No. 1	30 June 1999
A Measure passed by the General Synod of the Church of England to make further provision with respect to the constitution, statutes and administration of cathedrals. (Repealed by Cathedrals Measure 2021)
Care of Places of Worship Measure 1999 (repealed)	1999 No. 2	30 June 1999
A Measure passed by the General Synod of the Church of England to make provision in relation to the care of certain buildings used for or in connection with worship; and for purposes connected therewith. (Repealed by Ecclesiastical Jurisdiction and Care of Churches Measure 2018 (No. 3))
Church of England (Miscellaneous Provisions) Measure 2000	2000 No. 1	28 July 2000
A Measure passed by the General Synod of the Church of England to transfer certain functions of the Church Commissioners to diocesan bodies; to make provision for the performance of a rural dean's functions during a vacancy, absence or illness; to enable dioceses to re-name rural deans as area deans; to amend section 1 of the Consecration of Churchyards Act 1867; (Note: Consecration of Churchyards Act 1867 (30 & 31 Vict. c. 133)) to amend section 12(10) of the City of London (Guild Churches) Act 1952; (Note: City of London (Guild Churches) Act 1952 (15 & 16 Geo. 6 & 1 Eliz. 2. c. xxxviii)) to amend the Schedule to the Church Funds Investment Measure 1958; to amend section 8 of the Ecclesiastical Jurisdiction Measure 1963; to amend section 21 of the Repair of Benefice Buildings Measure 1972; (Note: Repair of Benefice Buildings Measure 1972 (No. 2)) to amend section 4 of the Ecclesiastical Fees Measure 1986; (Note: Ecclesiastical Fees Measure 1986 (No. 2)) to amend section 3 of the Patronage (Benefices) Measure 1986; to amend section 6 of the Church of England (Legal Aid and Miscellaneous Provisions) Measure 1988; to repeal certain enactments which are no longer of practical utility; and for purposes connected therewith.
Churchwardens Measure 2001	2001 No. 1	10 April 2001
A Measure passed by the General Synod of the Church of England to make fresh provision with respect to churchwardens in the Church of England.
Synodical Government (Amendment) Measure 2003	2003 No. 1	6 March 2003
A Measure passed by the General Synod of the Church of England to amend the law relating to synodical government and for purposes connected therewith.
Church of England (Pensions) Measure 2003 (repealed)	2003 No. 2	6 March 2003
A Measure passed by the General Synod of the Church of England to make provision for a General Purposes Fund of the Church of England Pensions Board and to amend the Clergy Pensions Measure 1961 and the Pensions Measure 1977; (Note: Pensions Measure 1997 (No. 1)) and for connected purposes. (Repealed by Church of England Pensions Measure 2018 (No. 9))
Clergy Discipline Measure 2003	2003 No. 3	10 July 2003
A Measure passed by the General Synod of the Church of England to amend the law relating to ecclesiastical discipline, to amend section 3 of the Ecclesiastical Jurisdiction Measure 1963 and section 5(5) of the Ecclesiastical Judges and Legal Officers Measure 1976, and for purposes connected therewith.
Stipends (Cessation of Special Payments) Measure 2005	2005 No. 1	24 March 2005
A Measure passed by the General Synod of the Church of England to provide for the cessation of guaranteed annuities payable by the Church Commissioners to incumbents and certain other payments made to dioceses; to provide for the application of sums made available in consequence thereof; and for connected purposes.
Care of Cathedrals (Amendment) Measure 2005 (repealed)	2005 No. 2	24 March 2005
A Measure passed by the General Synod of the Church of England to amend the Care of Cathedrals Measure 1990 (Note: Care of Cathedrals Measure 1990 (No. 2)) and the Cathedrals Measure 1999; (Note: Cathedrals Measure 1999 (No. 1)) and for connected purposes. (Repealed by Care of Cathedrals Measure 2011 (No. 1))
Church of England (Miscellaneous Provisions) Measure 2005	2005 No. 3	24 March 2005
A Measure passed by the General Synod of the Church of England to amend the Parsonages Measure 1938; to amend sections 6 and 11 of the Church Commissioners Measure 1947; to repeal section 7 of the Diocesan Stipends Funds Measure 1953; to amend section 8 of the Parochial Church Councils (Powers) Measure 1956; to amend section 20 of the Church Property (Miscellaneous Provisions) Measure 1960; to amend the Repair of Benefice Buildings Measure 1972; to amend the Endowments and Glebe Measure 1976; to amend the Pastoral Measure 1983; to make provision for the appointment of diocesan secretaries; and for purposes connected therewith.
Church of England (Miscellaneous Provisions) Measure 2006	2006 No. 1	11 July 2006
A Measure passed by the General Synod of the Church of England to amend the Parsonages Measure 1938; to amend the Church Commissioners Measure 1947; to amend the Diocesan Stipends Funds Measure 1953; to amend section 2 of the Church Funds Investment Measure 1958; to amend section 7 of the Church Property (Miscellaneous Provisions) Measure 1960; to make new provision for the powers of the Church Commissioners relating to Farnham Castle; to amend the Ecclesiastical Jurisdiction Measure 1963; to amend Schedule 2 to the Synodical Government Measure 1969; (Note: Synodical Government Measure 1969 (No. 2)) to amend the Repair of Benefice Buildings Measure 1972; to amend the Endowments and Glebe Measure 1976; to amend section 8 of the Church of England (Miscellaneous Provisions) Measure 1978; (Note: Church of England (Miscellaneous Provisions) Measure 1978) to amend the Pastoral Measure 1983; to amend the National Institutions Measure 1998; (Note: National Institutions Measure 1998 (No. 1)) and for purposes connected therewith.
Pastoral (Amendment) Measure 2006 (repealed)	2006 No. 2	11 July 2006
A Measure passed by the General Synod of the Church of England to enable leases to be granted of parts of churches and of land belonging or annexed to a church and for connected purposes. (Repealed by Mission and Pastoral Measure 2011 (No. 3))
Dioceses, Pastoral and Mission Measure 2007	2007 No. 1	30 October 2007
A Measure passed by the General Synod of the Church of England to further the mission of the Church of England and, in particular, to make new provision, in place of the Dioceses Measure 1978 and section 8 of the Church of England (Miscellaneous Provisions) Measure 1983, for reviewing the provincial and diocesan structure of the Church of England and for making reorganisation schemes, for the change of name of sees, and for the creation and filling of suffragan sees, for the nomination of suffragan bishops and the delegation of functions to them and to other persons in episcopal orders and for the discharge of functions of certain diocesan bodies; to amend the Pastoral Measure 1983 in respect of the making of pastoral schemes and orders and of schemes for the closure of churches for regular public worship; to enable a diocesan bishop, by order, to endorse and make provision for mission initiatives; to make new provision for mission and pastoral committees; to replace the Council for the Care of Churches with a body named the Church Buildings Council and make new provision for it; to make provision for the description of assistant curates and for their functions; to make other amendments to the Pastoral Measure 1983; and for connected purposes.
Church of England Marriage Measure 2008	2008 No. 1	22 May 2008
A Measure passed by the General Synod of the Church of England to enable persons to be married in a place of worship in a parish with which they have a qualifying connection; and for connected purposes.
Ecclesiastical Offices (Terms of Service) Measure 2009	2009 No. 1	2 April 2009
A Measure passed by the General Synod of the Church of England to make new provision for the terms of service of the holders of ecclesiastical offices; and for purposes connected therewith.
Church of England Pensions (Amendment) Measure 2009 (repealed)	2009 No. 2	2 April 2009
A Measure passed by the General Synod of the Church of England to extend from 31st December 2011 to 31st December 2018 the expiry of the period within which the Church Commissioners may make capital payments towards the cost of lump sums and pensions due to be paid or payable under certain pension and superannuation schemes; and for connected purposes. (Repealed by Church of England Pensions Measure 2018 (No. 9))
Church of England (Miscellaneous Provisions) Measure 2010	2010 No. 1	18 March 2010
A Measure to amend the New Parishes Measure 1943; to amend section 6 of the Church Commissioners Measure 1947; to amend section 2 of the Church Funds Investment Measure 1958; to amend section 21 of the Clergy Pensions Measure 1961; to amend section 2 of the Ecclesiastical Jurisdiction Measure 1963; to amend the Endowments and Glebe Measure 1976; to amend section 69 of the Pastoral Measure 1983; to amend Schedule 1 to the National Institutions Measure 1998; to amend section 24 of the Commons Act 2006; (Note: Commons Act 2006 (c. 26)) to make provision for gifts made to or for the benefit of the Church of England; to make provision for the status of corporate bodies of cathedrals and new provision with respect to canons in Christ Church cathedral; and for purposes connected therewith.
Vacancies in Suffragan Sees and Other Ecclesiastical Offices Measure 2010	2010 No. 2	18 March 2010
A Measure to amend the law with respect to the appointment of suffragan bishops; and with respect to appointments to fill vacancies in certain ecclesiastical offices to which Her Majesty has the right of presentation.
Crown Benefices (Parish Representatives) Measure 2010	2010 No. 3	18 March 2010
A Measure to make provision for the appointment of lay parish representatives to approve the selection of incumbents of certain Crown benefices.
Care of Cathedrals Measure 2011	2011 No. 1	24 May 2011
A Measure passed by the General Synod of the Church of England to consolidate, with corrections and minor improvements, the Care of Cathedrals Measure 1990, the Care of Cathedrals (Supplementary Provisions) Measure 1994 (Note: Care of Cathedrals (Supplementary Provisions) Measure 1994 (No. 2)) and the Care of Cathedrals (Amendment) Measure 2005, (Note: Care of Cathedrals (Amendment) Measure 2005 (No. 2)) and related enactments.
Ecclesiastical Fees (Amendment) Measure 2011	2011 No. 2	24 May 2011
A Measure passed by the General Synod of the Church of England to make further provision with respect to ecclesiastical fees; to amend the constitution of the Fees Advisory Commission and the provisions for certain annual fees; and for purposes connected therewith.
Mission and Pastoral Measure 2011	2011 No. 3	24 May 2011
A Measure passed by the General Synod of the Church of England to consolidate with corrections and minor improvements the Pastoral Measure 1983 and Parts 3, 4, 5 and 6 and section 61 of the Dioceses, Pastoral and Mission Measure 2007, (Note: Dioceses, Pastoral and Mission Measure 2007 (No. 1)) and related enactments which are designed to make better provision for the cure of souls.
Church of England Marriage (Amendment) Measure 2012	2012 No. 1	19 December 2012
A Measure passed by the General Synod of the Church of England to amend the Church of England Marriage Measure 2008 to widen the conditions for establishing the qualifying connections of persons intending to be married in certain cases and to provide for the form of banns of matrimony where the form set out in the Book of Common Prayer is not used and for the time of the publication of banns; and for connected purposes.
Diocese in Europe Measure 2013	2013 No. 1	26 March 2013
A Measure passed by the General Synod of the Church of England to make further provision for the Diocese in Europe.
Clergy Discipline (Amendment) Measure 2013	2013 No. 2	26 March 2013
A Measure passed by the General Synod of the Church of England to amend the Clergy Discipline Measure 2003; (Note: Clergy Discipline Measure 2003 (No. 3)) and for connected purposes.
Church of England (Miscellaneous Provisions) Measure 2014	2014 No. 1	14 May 2014
A Measure passed by the General Synod of the Church of England to amend section 67 of the Ecclesiastical Commissioners Act 1840; to amend section 25 of the Burial Act 1857; (Note: Burial Act 1857 (20 & 21 Vict. c. 81)) to amend section 5 of the Episcopal Endowments and Stipends Measure 1943; (Note: Episcopal Endowments and Stipends Measure 1943 (6 & 7 Geo. 6. No. 2)) to amend the Church Commissioners Measure 1947; to amend the Parochial Church Councils (Powers) Measure 1956; to amend the Clergy Pensions Measure 1961; to amend sections 2 and 3 of the Ecclesiastical Jurisdiction Measure 1963; to amend section 3 of the Faculty Jurisdiction Measure 1964; (Note: Faculty Jurisdiction Measure 1964 (No. 5)) to amend the Overseas and Other Clergy (Ministry and Ordination) Measure 1967; to amend the Synodical Government Measure 1969; to amend the Endowments and Glebe Measure 1976; to amend the Incumbents (Vacation of Benefices) Measure 1977; to amend the Patronage (Benefices) Measure 1986; to amend the Care of Churches and Ecclesiastical Jurisdiction Measure 1991; to amend the Cathedrals Measure 1999; to confer power on chancellors to determine fees; to extend the powers of the General Cemetery Company; to make provision for Christ Church, Oxford; to make provision for the tenure of office of vicars general and surrogates; to amend the Dioceses, Pastoral and Mission Measure 2007; to make minor and consequential amendments to other enactments; and for connected purposes.
Bishops and Priests (Consecration and Ordination of Women) Measure 2014	2014 No. 2	23 October 2014
A Measure passed by the General Synod of the Church of England to make provision for the consecration of women as bishops and for the continuation of provision for the ordination of women as priests; to repeal the Priests (Ordination of Women) Measure 1993; (Note: Priests (Ordination of Women) Measure 1993 (No. 2)) and for connected purposes.
Care of Churches and Ecclesiastical Jurisdiction (Amendment) Measure 2015	2015 No. 1	12 February 2015
A Measure passed by the General Synod of the Church of England to amend the Care of Churches and Ecclesiastical Jurisdiction Measure 1991 and the Ecclesiastical Jurisdiction Measure 1963.
Ecclesiastical Property Measure 2015	2015 No. 2	12 February 2015
A Measure passed by the General Synod of the Church of England to amend the law relating to certain ecclesiastical land and personal property held for ecclesiastical purposes.
Church of England (Pensions) (Amendment) Measure 2015 (repealed)	2015 No. 3	12 February 2015
A Measure passed by the General Synod of the Church of England to extend until 31 December 2025 the period within which the Church Commissioners may make capital payments towards the cost of lump sums and pensions due to be paid or payable under certain pension and superannuation schemes; and for connected purposes. (Repealed by Church of England Pensions Measure 2018 (No. 9))
Safeguarding and Clergy Discipline Measure 2016	2016 No. 1	16 March 2016
A Measure passed by the General Synod of the Church of England to make provision about safeguarding children and vulnerable adults; and to amend the Clergy Discipline Measure 2003.
Diocesan Stipends Funds (Amendment) Measure 2016	2016 No. 2	16 March 2016
A Measure passed by the General Synod of the Church of England to enable the capital account of a diocesan stipends fund to be invested on a total return basis.
Statute Law (Repeals) Measure 2018	2018 No. 1	10 May 2018
A Measure passed by the General Synod of the Church of England to repeal certain enactments of ecclesiastical law which (except in so far as their effect is preserved) are no longer of practical utility.
Pensions (Pre-consolidation) Measure 2018 (repealed)	2018 No. 2	10 May 2018
A Measure passed by the General Synod of the Church of England to make amendments of provisions relating to Church of England pensions designed to facilitate, or which are otherwise desirable in connection with, the consolidation of the legislation on that subject. (Repealed by Church of England Pensions Measure 2018 (No. 9))
Ecclesiastical Jurisdiction and Care of Churches Measure 2018	2018 No. 3	10 May 2018
A Measure passed by the General Synod of the Church of England to consolidate with corrections and minor improvements certain enactments relating to ecclesiastical jurisdiction and the care of churches and other places of worship.
Mission and Pastoral etc. (Amendment) Measure 2018	2018 No. 4	10 May 2018
A Measure passed by the General Synod of the Church of England to amend and simplify certain provisions of the Mission and Pastoral Measure 2011, (Note: Mission and Pastoral Measure 2011 (No. 3)) the Endowments and Glebe Measure 1976 and the Patronage (Benefices) Measure 1986; to make minor clarificatory amendments; and for connected purposes.
Legislative Reform Measure 2018	2018 No. 5	10 May 2018
A Measure passed by the General Synod of the Church of England to enable provision to be made for the purpose of removing or reducing burdens resulting from ecclesiastical legislation; and to enable provision to be made for the purpose of facilitating consolidations of ecclesiastical legislation.
Ecumenical Relations Measure 2018	2018 No. 6	20 December 2018
A Measure passed by the General Synod of the Church of England to make provision about ecumenical relations.
Church of England (Miscellaneous Provisions) Measure 2018	2018 No. 7	20 December 2018
A Measure passed by the General Synod of the Church of England to make miscellaneous provision relating to matters concerning the Church of England.
Church Property Measure 2018	2018 No. 8	20 December 2018
A Measure passed by the General Synod of the Church of England to consolidate with corrections and minor improvements the Parsonages Measure 1938, the New Parishes Measure 1943, the Parsonages (Amendment) Measure 1947, (Note: Parsonages (Amendment) Measure 1947 (10 & 11 Geo. 6. No. 3)) certain provisions of the Church Property (Miscellaneous Provisions) Measure 1960 and the Endowments and Glebe Measure 1976 and certain other provisions relating to Church property.
Church of England Pensions Measure 2018	2018 No. 9	20 December 2018
A Measure passed by the General Synod of the Church of England to consolidate with corrections and minor improvements certain enactments relating to Church of England pensions.
Church Representation and Ministers Measure 2019	2019 No. 1	4 July 2019
A Measure passed by the General Synod of the Church of England to make provision about Church representation and ministers.
Church of England (Miscellaneous Provisions) Measure 2020	2020 No. 1	16 March 2020
A Measure passed by the General Synod of the Church of England to make miscellaneous provision relating to matters concerning the Church of England.
Channel Islands Measure 2020	2020 No. 2	22 July 2020
A Measure passed by the General Synod of the Church of England to make provision for enabling the attachment of the Channel Islands to the diocese of Salisbury; to make further provision for the application of Church Measures to the Channel Islands; and to make further provision for Church representation for the Channel Islands.
General Synod (Remote Meetings) (Temporary Standing Orders) Measure 2020	2020 No. 3	4 November 2020
A Measure passed by the General Synod of the Church of England to make provision enabling remote meetings of the General Synod.
Diocesan Boards of Education Measure 2021	2021 No. 1	29 April 2021
A Measure passed by the General Synod of the Church of England to make provision about Diocesan Boards of Education.
Cathedrals Measure 2021	2021 No. 2	29 April 2021
A Measure passed by the General Synod of the Church of England to make provision about the governance, management, property and financial affairs of cathedrals.
Safeguarding (Code of Practice) Measure 2021	2021 No. 3	20 October 2021
A Measure passed by the General Synod of the Church of England to make provision for a code of practice on safeguarding children and vulnerable adults.
Diocesan Stipends Funds (Amendment) Measure 2023	2023 No. 1	29 June 2023
A Measure passed by the General Synod of the Church of England to enable money from the income account of a diocesan stipends fund to be given to other dioceses.
Church of England (Miscellaneous Provisions) Measure 2024	2024 No. 1	25 January 2024
A Measure passed by the General Synod of the Church of England to make miscellaneous provisions relating to matters concerning the Church of England.
Church of England Pensions (Application of Capital Funds) Measure 2024	2024 No. 2	25 January 2024
A Measure passed by the General Synod of the Church of England to extend until 31st December 2032 the period within which the Church Commissioners may make capital payments towards the cost of lump sums and pensions payable under certain pension and superannuation schemes.
Chancel Repair (Church Commissioners’ Liability) Measure 2025	2025 No. 1	3 April 2025
A Measure of the General Synod of the Church of England to provide for any liability of the Church Commissioners to repair the chancel of a church to have effect as a statutory duty.
Church Funds Investment Measure 2025	2025 No. 2	3 April 2025
A Measure of the General Synod of the Church of England to make provision enabling the transfer of the assets of certain funds connected with the Church of England.
Armed Forces Chaplains (Licensing) Measure 2025	2025 No. 3	18 December 2025
A Measure of the General Synod of the Church of England to make provision for licensing Armed Forces chaplains to exercise their ministry, in that capacity, at any place in the province of Canterbury or York.
Abuse Redress Measure 2025	2025 No. 4	18 December 2025
A Measure of the General Synod of the Church of England to create entitlements to redress in connection with certain persons who suffered abuse; to establish a fund for awards of redress; and for connected purposes.
Clergy Conduct Measure 2026	2026 No. 1	8 July 2026
A Measure of the General Synod of the Church of England to amend the law on regulation of the conduct of clergy.

== Diocese of Sodor and Man ==
This is a list of measures of the Diocese of Sodor and Man, which are the legislation of the Church of England.

Short title, or popular name	Citation	Royal assent
Long title
Legal Aid and Miscellaneous Provisions (Isle of Man) Measure 1990	SM 1 of 1990	14 February 1990
A Measure enacted pursuant to the Church (Application of General Synod Measures) Act 1979 to extend the Church of England (Legal Aid and Miscellaneous Provisions) Measure 1988 to the Isle of Man.
Church (Miscellaneous Provisions) Measure (Isle of Man) 1990	SM 2 of 1990	20 November 1990
A Measure enacted pursuant to the Church (Application of General Synod Measures) Act 1979 to extend the Incumbents and Churchwardens (Trusts) Measure 1964, the Churchwardens (Appointment and Resignation) Measure 1964, the Clergy (Ordination and Miscellaneous Provisions) Measure 1964, the Church of England (Miscellaneous Provisions) Measure 1983, the Ecclesiastical Fees Measure 1986 and section 3 of the Deacons (Ordination of Women) Measure 1986 to the Isle of Man.
Care of Churches and Ecclesiastical Jurisdiction Measure (Isle of Man) 1992 (repealed)	SM 1 of 1992	28 October 1992
A Measure enacted pursuant to the Church (Application of General Synod Measures) Act 1979 to extend the Care of Churches and Ecclesiastical Jurisdiction Measure 1991 to the Isle of Man.
Church (Miscellaneous Provisions) Measure (Isle of Man) 1993	SM 1 of 1993	27 October 1993
A Measure enacted pursuant to the Church (Application of General Synod Measures) Act 1979 to extend certain provisions of the Church of England (Miscellaneous Provisions) Measure 1992 to the Isle of Man.
Statute Law Revision Measure (Isle of Man) 1994	SM 1 of 1994	18 May 1994
A Measure enacted pursuant to the Church (Application of General Synod Measures) Act 1979 to make minor modifications and amendments of statutory provisions, and to repeal spent and obsolete provisions, relating to the Church of England in the Isle of Man.
Legal Aid Measure (Isle of Man) 1995	SM 1 of 1995	18 October 1995
A Measure enacted pursuant to the Church Legislation Procedure Act 1993 to extend the Church of England (Legal Aid) Measure 1994 to the Isle of Man.
Church (Miscellaneous Provisions) Measure (Isle of Man) 1996	SM 1 of 1996	9 December 1996
A Measure enacted pursuant to the Church Legislation Procedure Act 1993 to extend the Pastoral (Amendment) Measure 1994 and certain provisions of the Church of England (Miscellaneous Provisions) Measure 1995 to the Isle of Man.
Patronage Measure (Isle of Man) 1997	SM 1 of 1997	22 July 1997
A Measure enacted pursuant to the Church Legislation Procedure Act 1993 to extend the Patronage (Benefices) Measure 1986 to the Isle of Man; to provide for refusal to institute a person presented to a benefice; and for connected purposes.
Church Records Measure (Isle of Man) 2000	SM 1 of 2000	11 July 2000
A Measure enacted pursuant to the Church Legislation Procedure Act 1993 to make provision with respect to the deposit, custody and care of certain registers and other ecclesiastical records, and with respect to the registration of baptisms and burials; and for connected purposes.
Church (Miscellaneous Provisions) Measure (Isle of Man) 2002	SM 1 of 2002	19 February 2002
A Measure enacted pursuant to the Church Legislation Procedure Act 1993 to extend to the Isle of Man certain provisions of the Church of England (Miscellaneous Provisions) Measure 2000.
Clergy Discipline Measure (Isle of Man) 2005	SM 1 of 2005	13 July 2005
A Measure enacted pursuant to the Church Legislation Procedure Act 1993 to extend the Clergy Discipline Measure 2003 to the Isle of Man; and for connected purposes.
Church (Miscellaneous Provisions) Measure (Isle of Man) 2009	SM 1 of 2009	21 October 2009
A Measure enacted pursuant to the Church Legislation Procedure Act 1993 to extend to the Isle of Man certain provisions of the Church of England (Miscellaneous Provisions) Measure 2005 and the Church of England (Miscellaneous Provisions) Measure 2006; to amend the Care of Churches and Ecclesiastical Jurisdiction Measure (Isle of Man) 1992; and to transfer certain rule-making functions.
Parochial Church Councils and Accounts Measure (Isle of Man) 2010	SM 1 of 2010	19 October 2010
A Measure enacted pursuant to the Church Legislation Procedure Act 1993 to make further provision for parochial church councils and certain parochial trusts; and for connected purposes.
Convocations Measure (Isle of Man) 2010	SM 2 of 2010	19 October 2010
A Measure enacted pursuant to the Church Legislation Procedure Act 1993 to repeal the Convocations Ordinance 1703.
Church Offices Measure (Isle of Man) 2011	SM 1 of 2011	12 July 2011
A Measure enacted pursuant to the Church Legislation Procedure Act 1993 to extend to the Isle of Man certain provisions of the Dioceses, Pastoral and Mission Measure 2007, the Church of England (Miscellaneous Provisions) Measure 2010, the Vacancies in Suffragan Sees and other Ecclesiastical Offices Measure 2010 and the Crown Benefices (Parish Representatives) Measure 2010; to amend the constitution of the Cathedral Chapter; to make new provision for the office of registrar of the diocese; and to make provision for the relinquishment of Holy Orders.
Church Property Measure (Isle of Man) 2021	SM 2 of 2011	12 July 2011
A Measure enacted pursuant to the Church Legislation Procedure Act 1993 to extend to the Isle of Man certain provisions of the Dioceses, Pastoral and Mission Measure 2007, the Church of England (Miscellaneous Provisions) Measure 2010, the Vacancies in Suffragan Sees and other Ecclesiastical Offices Measure 2010 and the Crown Benefices (Parish Representatives) Measure 2010; to amend the constitution of the Cathedral Chapter; to make new provision for the office of registrar of the diocese; and to make provision for the relinquishment of Holy Orders.
Ecclesiastical Offices (Terms of Service) Measure (Isle of Man) 2012	SM 1 of 2012	20 March 2012
A Measure enacted pursuant to the Church Legislation Procedure Act 1993 to extend to the Isle of Man the Ecclesiastical Offices (Terms of Service) Measure 2009.
Mission and Pastoral Measure (Isle of Man) 2012	SM 2 of 2012	10 July 2012
A Measure enacted pursuant to the Church Legislation Procedure Act 1993 to re- enact with amendments the Pastoral Measure 1983; to provide for the creation of mission partnerships; to abolish rural deaneries and the office of rural dean; to abolish the separate districts of certain chapels; and for connected purposes.
Churchwardens Measure (Isle of Man) 2013	SM 1 of 2013	10 December 2013
A Measure enacted pursuant to the Church Legislation Procedure Act 1993 to make new provision with respect to churchwardens.
Clergy Discipline (Amendment) Measure (Isle of Man) 2013	SM 2 of 2013	10 December 2013
A Measure enacted pursuant to the Church Legislation Procedure Act 1993 to extend to the Isle of Man the Clergy Discipline (Amendment) Measure 2013.
Church Fees Measure (Isle of Man) 2014	SM 1 of 2014	18 March 2014
A Measure enacted pursuant to the Church Legislation Procedure Act 1993 to make new provision for ecclesiastical fees.
Church (Miscellaneous Provisions) Measure (Isle of Man) 2015	SM 1 of 2015	16 June 2015
A Measure enacted pursuant to the Church Legislation Procedure Act 1993 to extend to the Isle of Man certain provisions of the Church of England (Miscellaneous Provisions) Measure 2014; to amend the Mission and Pastoral Measure (Isle of Man) 2012; and to repeal certain obsolete enactments.
Bishops and Priests (Consecration and Ordination of Women) Measure (Isle of Man) 2015	SM 2 of 2015	15 July 2015
A Measure enacted pursuant to the Church Legislation Procedure Act 1993 to extend to the Isle of Man the Bishops and Priests (Consecration and Ordination of Women) Measure 2014.
Patronage (Amendment) Measure (Isle of Man) 2015	SM 3 of 2015	15 July 2015
A Measure enacted pursuant to the Church Legislation Procedure Act 1993 to make further provision for the exercise of patronage in relation to parochial benefices.
Care of Churches and Ecclesiastical Jurisdiction (Amendment) Measure (Isle of Man) 2016	SM 1 of 2016	16 February 2016
A Measure to extend to the Isle of Man certain provisions of the Care of Churches and Ecclesiastical Jurisdiction (Amendment) Measure 2015; and for connected purposes.
Safeguarding and Clergy Discipline Measure (Isle of Man) 2017	SM 1 of 2017	18 July 2017
A Measure enacted pursuant to the Church Legislation Procedure Act 1993 to extend to the Isle of Man the Safeguarding and Clergy Discipline Measure 2016 and certain provisions of the Dioceses, Pastoral and Mission Measure 2007; to amend the Churchwardens Measure (Isle of Man) 2013; and for connected purposes.
Mission and Pastoral (Amendment) Measure (Isle of Man) 2018	SM 1 of 2018	20 February 2018
A Measure enacted pursuant to the Church Legislation Procedure Act 1993 to make provision for mission initiatives; to amend the provisions relating to pastoral reorganisation; to make minor amendments and repeals; and for connected purposes.
Marriage Measure (Isle of Man) 2019	SM 1 of 2019	15 January 2019
A Measure enacted pursuant to the Church Legislation Procedure Act 1993 to enable persons to be married in a place of worship in a parish with which they have a qualifying connection.
Ecclesiastical Jurisdiction and Care of Churches Measure (Isle of Man) 2019	SM 2 of 2019	9 April 2019
A Measure enacted pursuant to the Church Legislation Procedure Act 1993 to extend to the Island certain provisions of the Ecclesiastical Jurisdiction and Care of Churches Measure 2018; and for connected purposes.
Church Representation and Ministers Measure (Isle of Man) 2020	SM 1 of 2020	7 March 2020
A Measure enacted pursuant to the Church Legislation Procedure Act 1993 to extend to the Isle of Man the Church Representation and Ministers Measure 2019; and for connected purposes.
Church (Miscellaneous Provisions) Measure (Isle of Man) 2021	SM 1 of 2021	16 February 2021
A Measure enacted pursuant to the Church Legislation Procedure Act 1993 to extend to the Isle of Man the Ecumenical Relations Measure 2018, the Church of England (Miscellaneous Provisions) Measure 2018 and the Church of England (Miscellaneous Provisions) Measure 2020; and for connected purposes.
Marriage Measure (Isle of Man) 2022	SM 1 of 2022	21 June 2022
A Measure enacted pursuant to the Church Legislation Procedure Act 1993 to make new provision for preliminaries to a marriage according to the rites of the Church of England of certain foreign nationals.
Safeguarding (Code of Practice) Measure (Isle of Man) 2022	SM 2 of 2022	21 June 2022
A Measure enacted pursuant to the Church Legislation Procedure Act 1993 to extend to the Isle of Man the Safeguarding (Code of Practice) Measure 2021; and for connected purposes
Church of England (Miscellaneous Provisions) Measure 2024	SM 1 of 2024	25 January 2024
A Measure passed by the General Synod of the Church of England to make miscellaneous provisions relating to matters concerning the Church of England.
Cathedral Measure (Isle of Man) 2025	SM 1 of 2025	8 July 2025
A Measure enacted pursuant to the Church Legislation Procedure Act 1993 to make provision about the governance, management, property and financial affairs of the Cathedral Church of Saint German; and for connected purposes.
Church (Miscellaneous Provisions) Measure (Isle of Man) 2025	SM 2 of 2025	8 July 2025
A Measure enacted pursuant to the Church Legislation Procedure Act 1993 to extend to the Isle of Man the Church of England (Miscellaneous Provisions) Measure 2024; to repeal obsolete provisions relating to sequestration; and for connected purposes.

== See also ==
- Church of England instrument
