= Synodical Government Measure 1969 =

Church of England measure

Synodical Government Measure 1969 (Note: Section 9(1).)
- Measure of the Church of England
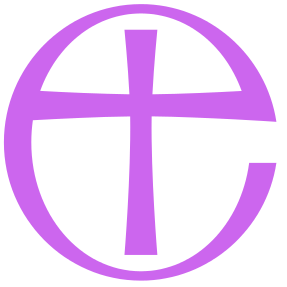
- General Synod of the Church of England
- Long title: A Measure passed by The National Assembly of the Church of England to provide for the vesting by Canon of the functions, authority, rights and privileges of the Convocations of Canterbury and York in the General Synod of the Church of England, and for the modification by Canon of the functions of the said Convocations when sitting separately for their provinces; to rename and reconstitute the Church Assembly as the General Synod, and to make further provision for the synodical government of the Church of England, and for purposes connected with the matters aforesaid.
- Citation: 1969 No. 2
- Territorial extent: England; Channel Islands; Isle of Man; (Note: Section 9(3)–(4).)

Dates
- Royal assent: 25 July 1969
- Commencement: 25 July 1969 (Note: The Acts of Parliament (Commencement) Act 1793. See also section 9(2).)

Other legislation
- Amends: Interpretation Measure 1925; Parochial Church Councils (Powers) Measure 1956
- Amended by: Synodical Government (Special Majorities) Measure 1971Church of England (Worship and Doctrine) Measure 1974; Synodical Government (Amendment) Measure 1974; Church of England (Miscellaneous Provisions) Measure 1978; Synodical Government (Amendment) Measure 2003; Statute Law (Repeals) Act 2004; Church of England (Miscellaneous Provisions) Measure 2006; Charities Act 2011; Diocese in Europe Measure 2013; Church of England (Miscellaneous Provisions) Measure 2018; Church Representation and Ministers Measure 2019; Church of England (Miscellaneous Provisions) Measure 2020; Cathedrals Measure 2021; Safeguarding (Code of Practice) Measure 2021; Church of England (Miscellaneous Provisions) Measure 2024

Status: Amended

Text of statute as originally enacted

Revised text of statute as amended

Text of the Synodical Government Measure 1969 as in force today (including any amendments) within the United Kingdom, from legislation.gov.uk.

The Synodical Government Measure 1969 (No. 2) is a Church of England measure passed by the National Assembly of the Church of England replacing the National Assembly with the General Synod of the Church of England.

== Background ==
In 1919, the Parliament of the United Kingdom passed the Church of England Assembly (Powers) Act 1919 establishing the National Assembly of the Church of England. After the measure was passed, the previous state of arrangements was referred to as "paralysis" in the Ecclesiastical Law Journal.

Until this measure passed there were "many complications" with having the National Assembly and the convocations side-by-side, and it was deemed that the laity had too little share of power in the National Assembly.

== Provisions ==
Most of the powers of the Convocations of Canterbury and York were transferred to the General Synod, consisting of:

- a House of Laity
- a House of Clergy
- a House of Bishops

The measure established deanery synods which would be the lowest rung of the Church's hierarchy. To be eligible to be elected to the House of Laity you need to be elected to a deanery synod first.

=== Electoral roll ===
Originally, the measure established the voting age as 17. This has since been reduced to 16 through the passage of the Church Representation and Ministers Measure 2019.

== Channel Islands ==
The measure applied to the Channel Islands, through the Synodical Government (Channel Islands) Order 1970 (SI 1970/1117).

== Amendments ==
In 1971, the measure was amended by the Synodical Government (Special Majorities) Measure 1971 (No. 1) so that "special majorities" would be required to change the relationship between the Church of England and another church.

In 1974, the measure was amended by the Synodical Government (Amendment) Measure 1974 (No. 1) so that the constitutions of the Convocations of York and Canterbury would be required to change the relationship between the Church of England and another church.

In 2003, the measure was amended by the Synodical Government (Amendment) Measure 2003 (No. 1) so that there would be a regular review of the arrangements for pastoral supervision.

Legislation passed by the Church must now comply with the Human Rights Act 1998.
