= Delegated legislation in the United Kingdom =

UK law passed by a minister, rather than parliament

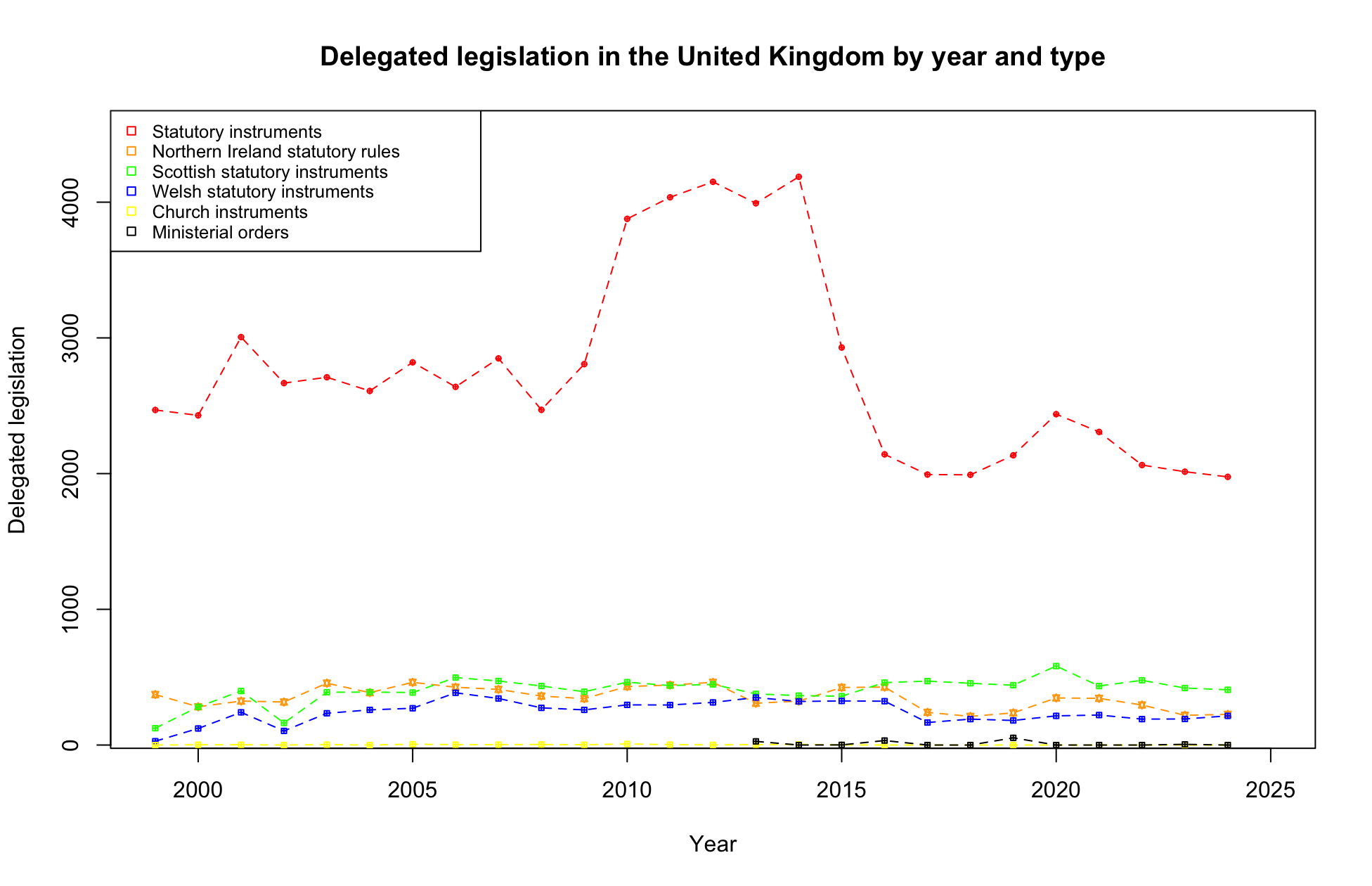
The number of each type of delegated legislation over time

Delegated legislation or secondary legislation in the United Kingdom is law that is not enacted by a legislative assembly such as the UK Parliament, but made by a government minister, a delegated person or an authorised body under powers given to them by an Act of Parliament.

Statutory instruments are the most frequently used type of secondary legislation, with approximately 3,500 made each year, although only about 1,000 need to be considered by Parliament. They usually have either "Rules", "Order" or "Regulations" in their title.

Secondary legislation is used for a wide variety of purposes such as fixing the date on which an Act of Parliament will come into force; setting fees for a public service; or establishing the details of an Act of Parliament. Delegated legislation is dependent on its parent act, which prescribes its parameters and procedures. Although a large volume of delegated legislation is written without close parliamentary scrutiny, there are statutory instruments to prevent its misuse.

== Background ==
Delegated legislation is derived from its parent act, which prescribes its parameters and procedures. Delegated legislation saves parliamentary time by considering matters of technical detail. Such details are prepared by those with relevant expert knowledge.

Through its inherent flexibility, delegated legislation accommodates changing circumstances such as changing fees for public services, developments in science or minor changes in government policy. Delegated legislation allows the rapid drafting of emergency powers. In comparison to acts of Parliament, which may take much time to pass, the flexibility of delegated legislation can be used to solve problems of governance in a timely way.

Delegated legislation is effected by signature of the author or his authorized representative. In the case of the monarch, only his verbal assent is required. A statutory instrument related to the parent act is required to write delegated legislation. It ensures the legislation is catalogued and published by the King's Printer. Exceptions are directions and by-laws where notifications are made to affected entities.

Criticism of delegated legislation may arise because:

1. it is subject to a lesser degree of parliamentary scrutiny than acts of Parliament.
2. it may be used to remove from the scrutiny of the parliament matters that are causing difficulty for the government by designating them "matters concerning detail".
3. within the large volume of delegated legislation there may be little public knowledge of changes being made. However, the statutory instruments are in place to prevent misuse.

== Types ==
Delegated legislation can take a variety of forms, each with different uses. The boundaries between the forms are not fixed. The types used will be determined by the wording of the parent Act.

- Orders in Council are made by the King on the advice of the Privy Council (the Government). Orders in Council are used in matters of constitutional significance. An example is bringing into force emergency powers to be exercised by ministers.
- Orders of Council are made by the lords of the Privy Council. They are used for regulation of professional bodies and the higher education sector.
- Ministerial orders are made by ministers.
- Orders exercise executive powers of government ministers. An example is the dissolution of a public body. Commencement orders set the date on which an Act, or part of an Act, comes into force.
- Regulations set out how an Act is to be implemented and are usually made by ministers.
- Rules set out procedures for operation of a government entity such as the courts or the Patent Office. Rules may be made by ministers or, if specified in the parent Act, a senior judge. In Scotland, rules of court take the form of Scottish statutory instruments. Those regulating civil procedure are enacted by the Court of Session and are called Acts of Sederunt. Those regulating criminal procedure are enacted by the High Court of Justiciary as Acts of Adjournal. Acts of Adjournal can modify primary legislation where it relates to criminal judicial procedure.
- Schemes are made by commissions to proscribe how entities under their remit are governed. An example is the Charity Commission which supervises charitable organizations.
- Directions are a means by which ministers give legally binding instructions to a public body about the way it exercises its functions.
- By-laws are laws of limited application (usually restricted to certain places) made by local authorities or certain other bodies (for example, train operating companies or the National Trust) to control the activities of the people in public spaces.
- Northern Ireland statutory rules are a form of delegated legislation made by ministers in the Northern Ireland Executive, or the Secretary of State for Northern Ireland during periods of direct rule. Previously they were made by the Government of Northern Ireland under Unionist rule.
- Scottish statutory instruments are a form of delegated legislation made by ministers in the Scottish Government.
- Welsh statutory instruments are a form of delegated legislation made by ministers in the Welsh Government.

=== Church of England instruments ===
The secondary legislation of the Church of England is known as "instruments". The procedure for the General Synod approving instruments is set out in the standing orders of the General Synod.

After approval of the General Synod, the instruments are presented before Parliament, signed by the Archbishop of Canterbury and the Archbishop of York.

Sometimes they have a different date for when they are "made" and when they come "into force".

So far they have only been used to commence Church of England measures.

==== Crown Dependencies ====
The Isle of Man has a similar system – the diocesan synod takes the place of the General Synod, Tynwald takes the place of Parliament and the Bishop of Sodor and Man takes the place of the Archbishops of Canterbury and York. Similarly to instruments the United Kingdom, in the Isle of Man orders are presented by the Lord Bishop of Sodor and Man to Tynwald so that to particular provisions of measures can be commenced.

There is no equivalent for the Channel Islands – application of measures to the Channel Islands happens at Parliament. Previously this happened through statutory instruments rather than instruments. Currently the procedure has been modified through the Channel Islands Measure 2020 so it will occur directly in the measure and therefore the instrument that commences the measure.

== Layout of official documents ==
A document which records delegated legislation will begin with a preamble. It describes the author of the legislation, the related parent Act and its preconditions and any stakeholders. The terms used in the document are determined by the type of delegated legislation it records. For instance, in orders, clauses are called "articles". Clauses may be grouped under headings and in complex delegated legislation, the document may be divided into parts. The main text is followed by any schedules and explanatory notes.

== Controls ==
Delegated legislation is controlled by Parliament and the judiciary. Parliamentary controls include "affirmative resolution procedures" where the legislation requires approval in both houses of parliament and "negative resolution procedures" where the legislation may be vetoed by either house. By convention, the House of Lords will not veto but rather pass a motion to convey its concerns about the legislation.

Judicial control of delegated legislation is exercised through judicial review. Delegated legislation can be quashed by a court if it is found to be ultra vires (outside the parameters defined in the parent act). There are two types of ultra vires. In "substantive ultra vires", delegated legislation is deemed void because it goes beyond the powers defined in the parent act. In "procedural ultra vires", delegated legislation is deemed void because of some procedural deficiency. A court may also quash delegated legislation on the basis of unreasonableness.

== See also ==
- Statutory Instrument Practice, 3rd edition (June 2003), Cabinet Office and His Majesty's Stationery Office
- House of Commons Information Office Factsheet L7 - Statutory Instruments
