= Church of England measure =

Church legislation

A Church of England measure is primary legislation that is made by the General Synod of the Church of England and approved by the Parliament of the United Kingdom under section 3 of the Church of England Assembly (Powers) Act 1919.

== Procedure ==
=== Consideration by the General Synod ===
Measures are passed by the General Synod of the Church of England. Before the passage of the Synodical Government Measure 1969, this function was undertaken by the National Assembly of the Church of England.

The current procedure depends on the content of the measure and is set out in the Synodical Government Measure 1969 – draft measures are presented and approved before being sent to Parliament.

=== Ecclesiastical Committee ===
The Ecclesiastical Committee is a joint committee of the Parliament of the United Kingdom.

It comprises 30 members of the Parliament of the United Kingdom. The Lord Speaker appoints 15 members from the House of Lords, and the Speaker of the House of Commons appoints 15 MPs to serve on the committee.

The Church of England Assembly (Powers) Act 1919 requires the committee to report on "the nature and legal effect of the measure".

=== Motions by Houses of Parliament ===
A measure is then presented for approval of both Houses of Parliament at the same time as the committee lays its report, as long as the report is not an adverse report. In the Commons this is tabled by the Second Church Estates Commissioner, and in the House of Lords this is tabled by the Lords Spiritual.

=== Royal assent ===
Royal assent to Church of England measures were given by means of letters patent using the following wording:

Form of letters patent during the reign of Queen Elizabeth II (until 8 September 2022):

Letters patent for a measure receiving royal assent

ELIZABETH THE SECOND by the Grace of God of the United Kingdom of Great Britain and Northern Ireland and of Our other Realms and Territories Queen Head of the Commonwealth Defender of the Faith To Our right trusty and right well beloved the Lords Spiritual and Temporal and to Our trusty and well beloved the Knights Citizens and Burgesses of the House of Commons in this present Parliament assembled GREETING: FORASMUCH as in pursuance of the Church of England Assembly (Powers) Act 1919 certain Measures the short Titles of which are set forth in the said Schedule have been presented to Us in the form laid before Parliament AND forasmuch as We cannot at this time be present in the Higher House of Our said Parliament being the accustomed place for giving Our Royal Assent We have therefore caused these Our Letters Patent to be made and have signed them and by them do give Our Royal Assent to the said Measures WILLING that the said Measures shall be of the same strength force and effect as if We had been personally present in the said Higher House and had publicly and in the presence of you all assented to the same COMMANDING ALSO ['here insert the name of the Lord Chancellor'] Chancellor of Great Britain to seal these Our Letters with the Great Seal of Our Realm AND ALSO COMMANDING [here insert the names of the Commissioners, for example Our most dear and entirely beloved Son and most faithful Counsellor Charles Philip Arthur George Prince of Wales The Most Reverend Father in God and Our faithful Counsellor [...] of Canterbury Primate of All England and Metropolitan ['followed by the names of the Lord Chancellor and at least two other Lords of the Privy Council'] or any three or more of them to declare this Our Royal Assent in the said Higher House in the presence of you the said Lords and Commons and the Clerk of Our Parliaments to endorse the said Measures in Our name as is requisite and to record these Our Letters Patent and the said Measures in manner accustomed AND FINALLY WE do declare that after this Our Royal Assent given and declared as is aforesaid then and immediately the said Measures shall be taken and accepted as and good and perfect Measures and be put in due execution accordingly In Witness whereof We have caused these Our Letters to be made Patent WITNESS Ourself at Westminster the ... day of ... in the year of Our Reign By the Queen Herself

=== Enacting formula ===
Church of England measures do not have an enacting formula.

== Crown Dependencies ==
=== Isle of Man ===
The Isle of Man has a similar system – the diocesan synod takes the place of the General Synod, Tynwald takes the place of Parliament and the Bishop of Sodor and Man takes the place of the Lords Spiritual.

Under the Church (Application of General Synod Measures) Act 1979, the Church Act 1992 and the Church Legislation Procedure Act 1993, measures can be approved by the ecclesiastical committee of Tynwald after approval by the legislative committee of the diocesan synod.

=== Channel Islands ===
Measures can be applied to the Channel Islands when a clause within a measure indicates that they are to extend to those jurisdictions. The actual application of the relevant measure to the Channel Islands is made via an Order in Council, or via processes within the legislatures of the Channel Islands.

This procedure has been amended in 1957 and 2020, since it was originally established by the Channel Islands (Church Legislation) Measure 1931 (21 & 22 Geo 5. No. 4).

== See also ==
- List of Church of England measures
- Ordinance (canon law)
