= Tricameralism =

Government practice of having three legislative chambers

Tricameralism is the practice of having three legislative or parliamentary chambers. It is contrasted with unicameralism and bicameralism, which are both far more common. Currently, no national government is organized along tricameral institutions.

The word could describe the Ancien Régime era French Estates-General, though similar semantic arguments are applied since it sometimes met in joint session. The South African Parliament established under the apartheid regime's 1983 constitution was tricameral, as was the Chinese 1947 Constitution and Simón Bolívar's model state. A common feature in these bodies, which also casts some doubt on the appropriateness of the name, is that in several cases one of the three legislatures is not principally concerned with legislating.

There are different varieties of tricameralism. A disputed type of tricameralism is one where there are two legislative bodies, elected or appointed separately, and a third consisting of all members of the two, meeting together. In cases where this is considered tricameralism, such as the Manx Tynwald, the Indonesian People's Consultative Assembly, and the Icelandic Althing (from 1874 to 1991), there is generally an explicit, routine role for the unified house, which distinguishes it from bicameral systems where a joint sitting of the two bodies is used to resolve deadlocks or for special sessions, which is true in several parliaments including Australia, Switzerland and India. Arguments over whether tricameralism should be construed to include this arrangement or not are primarily semantic.

== Political ==
=== Africa ===
==== South Africa ====
In 1983, South Africa's apartheid government put forward a constitution providing for a tricameral legislature. On 2 November, around seventy percent of the country's White minority voted in favour of the changes – Black, Coloured and Indian South Africans were not consulted.

The South African tricameral parliament consisted of three race-based chambers:

- House of Assembly – 178 members, reserved for White people
- House of Representatives – 85 members, reserved for Coloured, or mixed-race, people
- House of Delegates – 45 members, reserved for Indian people

Black South Africans, who made up a majority of the population, were considered citizens of the bantustans and received no representation.

The creation of the tricameral parliament was controversial on two fronts. On the one hand, many White conservatives disliked the idea of non-Whites participating in Parliament at all. The dispute was a factor in the creation of the Conservative Party, a breakaway from the dominant National Party. On the other hand, many Coloured and Indian people rejected the system as a sham, saying that the chambers reserved for them were powerless.

The tricameral parliament was not particularly strong. The 1983 constitution significantly weakened the powers of parliament and abolished the position of Prime Minister. Most authorities were transferred to the State President, including the power to appoint the Cabinet. This was seen by many as an attempt to limit the power of Coloureds and Indians – not only were the non-White houses less powerful than the White one, but parliament itself was subordinate to a State President who was White.

=== Asia ===
==== Indonesia ====
Following amendments to the Constitution of Indonesia in the late 1990s and early 2000s, which became effective in 2004, the parliament of Indonesia has three institutions (of which one consists of the members of the other two), similar to Icelandic and Manx tricameralism:

- Dewan Perwakilan Rakyat (DPR-RI; literally People's Representative Council; officially House of Representatives), the lower house, which exercises most legislative power;
- Dewan Perwakilan Daerah (DPD-RI; Regional Representative Council), the upper house, a consultative body responsible for laws concerning regional government, but without its own direct lawmaking powers;
- Majelis Permusyawaratan Rakyat (MPR-RI; People's Consultative Assembly). Its members are those of the DPR and DPD. Its only responsibilities are to amend the Constitution, to swear in the President and Vice President, to impeach the President and Vice President, and to fill Presidential and Vice Presidential vacancies between elections.

Like the Icelandic Unified Parliament, the Indonesian People's Consultative Assembly has its own speaker and deputy speakers distinct from those of the DPR and DPD.

==== Republic of China ====
The 1947 Constitution of the Republic of China has three chambers of parliament that are elected. Governmental organs of the constitution follow the outline proposed by Sun Yat-sen and supported by the Kuomintang (Chinese Nationalist Party), while incorporating opinions of the federalism supporting Communist Party in the 1940s. The separation of powers was designed by Carsun Chang, a founding member of the China Democratic League.

- National Assembly (國民大會) – Directly elected by a county. It represented the entire nation and exercised the political rights thereof. It elected the President and has the power to amend the constitution, but its legislative functions were considered “reserve powers” to be exercised only on an ad hoc basis.
- Legislative Yuan (立法院) – Directly elected by a province. It is the principal and standing legislative body. It approves the Premier and supervises the Executive Yuan (the Cabinet).
- Control Yuan (監察院) – Indirectly elected by provincial legislatures. It is the government performance auditing body and approves grand justices of the Judicial Yuan (the Constitutional court) and commissioners of the Examination Yuan (the Civil service commission).

As the mechanism is significantly different from the Western trias politica, the grand justices has an interpretation which ruled that these three organs all bear characteristics equivalent to a "parliament".

However, the government of the Republic of China lost the Chinese Civil War in 1949 and retreated to Taiwan. A set of temporary provisions were passed by the National Assembly to gather more powers to the President and limit the functions of the tricameral parliament. Members of the tricameral parliament elected in mainland China in 1947 and 1948 continued serving in Taiwan without re-election until 1991.

After a series of constitutional amendments in the 1990s in Taiwan, a new set of temporary and separate Additional Articles of the Constitution changed the Legislative Yuan to a unicameral parliament, although the tricameral parliament still nominally exists. The Control Yuan was separated as a branch of government when the National Assembly was entirely shut down in June 2005.

==== Myanmar ====
Myanmar under 2008 constitution introduces a tricameral system involving three Hluttaws:

- The Pyithu Hluttaw (ပြည်သူ့လွှတ်တော်, lit. 'People's Assembly') formed with the representatives elected on the basis of township as well as population and representatives being the Defence Services (military) personnel nominated by the Commander-in-Chief of Defence Services.
- The Amyotha Hluttaw (အမျိုးသားလွှတ်တော်, lit. 'National Assembly'): formed with the representatives elected in equal numbers from Regions and States and the representatives being the Defence Services (military) personnel nominated by the Commander-in-Chief of Defence Services.
- The Pyidaungsu Hluttaw (ပြည်ထောင်စုလွှတ်တော်, lit. 'Union Assembly'): formed with all the representatives of the Pyithu Hluttaw and the Amyotha Hluttaw combines. The Pyidaungsu Hluttaw is more than just the Pyithu Hluttaw and Amyotha Hluttaw sitting jointly but is reported to be a separate, independent and dominant legislative entity unlike the typical bicameral legislatures.

According to the constitution,

- A Bill initiated in the Pyithu Hluttaw or the Amyotha Hluttaw and approved by both Hluttaws is deemed to be approved by the Pyidaungsu Hluttaw. But if there is any disagreement between these two Hluttaws, the bill has to be discussed and resolved in the Pyidaungsu Hluttaw. The resolution or amendment of any rule, regulation or by-law is also done in this way.
- The speaker of the Pyithu Hluttaw and that of the Amyotha Hluttaw alternatively serve as the speaker of the Pyidaungsu Hluttaw, the former for the 30 months and the latter for the remaining days.

The president sends back comments on draft bills to the Pyidaungsu Hluttaw rather than the Hluttaw house which initiated them.

=== Europe ===
==== Westminster systems ====
===== Isle of Man =====
The Tynwald, the parliament of the Isle of Man, is sometimes considered tricameral, although that description is not universally accepted. It has two branches, the House of Keys and the Legislative Council as well as a third body, the Tynwald Court, made up of the members from both branches, much like in the Icelandic and Indonesian systems.

Also like in the Icelandic and Indonesian systems, the classification of the Tynwald Court as a third chamber in its own right is controversial. Because the Court has no members who are not also members of the House of Keys or of the Legislative Council, the Court's status as an independent body rather than a combined body can be dubious. However, the island's government does claim that the Tynwald is in fact tri-cameral. The building itself which houses the Tynwald is literally "tri-cameral," containing three separate chambers for its sessions.

===== Church of England =====
The General Synod of the Church of England is sometimes described as tricameral. It is divided into the House of Bishops, the House of Clergy and the House of Laity.

As the Church of England is the state church of England, the Parliament of the United Kingdom has given the General Synod power (subject to veto) to make laws concerning the Church.

===== Medieval Ireland =====
In the fifteenth century, secular clergy of each diocese sent two proctors to the Parliament of Ireland, who met separately from the House of Commons and the House of Lords. In 1537, their right to membership was revoked after they opposed the Reformation in Ireland.

==== European Union ====
The European Union is sometimes considered tricameral, comprising the European Parliament, the Council of the European Union, and the European Commission. The European Parliament and Council of the European Union are the EU's two legislative bodies and amend and approve, or veto, the proposals of the European Commission, which holds the right of initiative.

==== France ====
===== Three estates =====
Some historians view the French States-General as an example of a tricameral legislature. The three estates gradually evolved as an advisory group for the King (including giving advice on legislation). The three estates were simply labeled First (clergy), Second (nobility), and Third (commoners).

There are two distinct problems with regarding the States-General as a tricameral legislature. The States-General never had formal lawmaking powers, although it sometimes had a major role in the King's legislative activity. In addition, the tripartite arrangement was inconsistently applied, in that they would deliberate separately or jointly at various times.

===== Consulate =====
The French Consulate (and later First French Empire, when the lower two chambers had no power) had a tricameral legislature, consisting of:

- the Sénat conservateur (Conservative Senate), the highest chamber, whose duty was to guard the Constitution, and upon the Consul's proposal, enact special laws known as sénatus-consultes;
- the Corps législatif (Legislative Body), successor to the Directoire's Conseil des Anciens (upper house), which was to vote on laws without discussing them (after 1804, with only a strictly curtailed discussion); and
- the Tribunat (Tribunate), successor of the Directoire's Conseil des Cinq Cents (lower house), which was to discuss laws and only vote on whether to “recommend” them to the Corps législatif.

Whether the Sénat was part of legislature, however, is open to doubt, for Sieyès (the main instigator of the Consulate's Constitution and later president of this Senate) described it as belonging to an altogether different power beyond the executive, legislative and judiciary: the conservative power. In effect, Napoléon made the Sénat a political élite to back his power as Consul and later Emperor, while the other two chambers were bent into submission. In 1807, the Tribunat was definitively abolished.

==== Iceland ====
After the Icelandic Parliament was restored by royal decree in 1844, it operated unicamerally from 1845 to 1874 when it became principally bicameral with an additional third chamber, known as Unified Parliament. The third chamber consisted of the union of the other two and deliberated as a single body, which makes some scholars classify it as only a bicameral system. However, the third chamber did have its own speaker distinct from the speakers for the other two chambers:

- Neðri deild, the Lower Chamber, was coequal to the upper chamber. Its members were elected by the electorate.
- Efri deild, the Upper Chamber, was coequal to the lower chamber. Half its members were originally appointed by the King of Denmark and had veto power until 1915 when all its members were elected democratically.
- Sameinað Alþingi, Unified Parliament. Its members were those of the lower and upper chambers. The third chamber originally only dealt with contentious matters but soon established its own standing committees, and starting in 1934, the third chamber had an exclusive role in amending and passing the annual budget bill. As the decades passed the third chamber took over many of the responsibilities of the lower and upper chambers.

The Icelandic Parliament followed the legislatures of Denmark and Sweden and became unicameral once more in 1991.

==== Yugoslavia ====
The "socio-political communities" of the Socialist Federal Republic of Yugoslavia – being Yugoslavia itself, the constituent Socialist Republics, the two Socialist Autonomous Provinces (Kosovo and Vojvodina) and the Communes – as per the 1974 Yugoslav Constitution, had three chambers of their legislative assemblies: a chamber of associated labour; a chamber of local communities/Communes; and a socio-political chamber.

Yugoslavia itself, despite being a "socio-political community", was exempt from this and had a traditional bicameral system more like other federal states.

These were gradually replaced by the republics when they broke from Yugoslavia during its collapse and transitioned to a capitalist system. Slovenia and Croatia conducted their first multi-party elections under the Yugoslav tricameral system, while all other republics reformed their Parliamentary structures ahead of their inaugural multi-party elections: Bosnia moved to a bicameral legislature, keeping the chamber of communities but replacing the other two with a chamber of citizens, while Serbia, Macedonia, and Montenegro opted for unicameralism.

=== South America ===
==== Bolívar's proposals ====
Simón Bolívar, the South American revolutionary leader, included a tricameral legislature as part of his proposals for a model government. Bolívar described the three houses as follows:

- Chamber of Tribunes, holding powers relating to government finance, foreign affairs, and war. The tribunes would, unlike the other two houses, be popularly elected.
- Senate, an apolitical body holding powers to enact law, supervise the judiciary, and appoint regional officials. Bolívar believed that the senate should be hereditary, saying that this was the only way to ensure its neutrality. There are parallels between Bolívar's Senate and other chambers such as the UK's House of Lords.
- Censors, a group who would act as a check against the powers of the other two. Bolívar described them as "prosecuting attorneys against the government in defense of the Constitution and popular rights". He also said that they should ensure that the executive was functioning satisfactorily, perhaps having powers of impeachment. Despite its legislative role, the Censorate's powers are more akin to a modern constitutional court.

Bolívar intended his model government to function as a parliamentary system, and so the tricameral parliament was expected to govern through the active administration of the cabinet ministers who would be accountable to it. Bolívar was explicit in many of his writings, particularly in his Message to the Congress of Angostura on how his proposed system was meant to reflect the way the British parliamentary system works. His proposal for Censors was not for them to act as legislators but rather to act as an office similar to an Ombudsman. As such, some opinions differ on whether his system could truly be classified as a tricameral parliament, considering that the Censors were not true legislators, but seemed to represent a separate branch of government altogether.

Despite Bolívar's huge influence in South America, no country in the region employs his tricameral parliament. Early attempts to implement the model, such as in Bolivia, were not successful, although the chaos of the period was likely a factor in this outcome. As a result of not adopting Bolívar's British-inspired parliamentary system, numerous celebrated political scientists like the late Juan Linz and many others have observed that the decision of many Latin American countries to model their systems of government on the presidential system of the United States has led to numerous examples of political instability and subsequent descent into dictatorship or chaos.

== Roman Republic ==
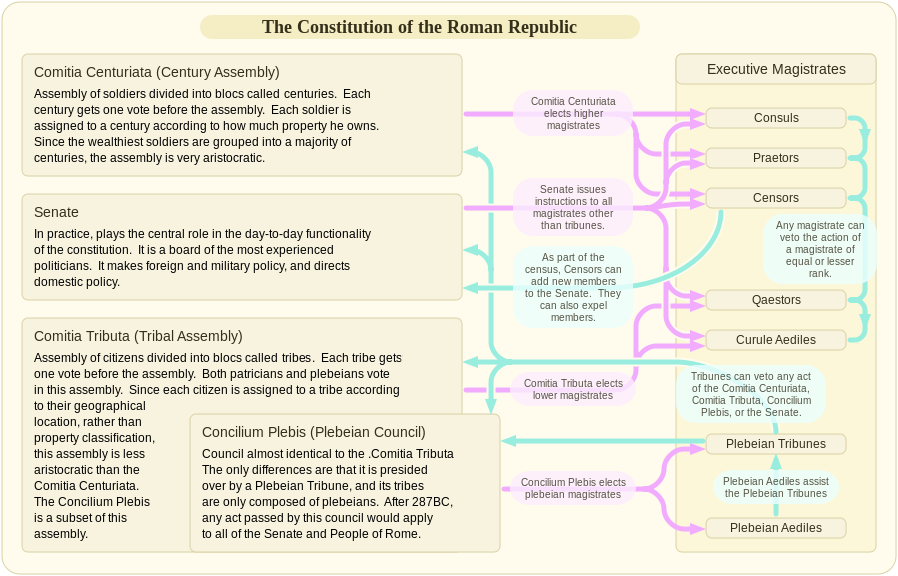
Chart showing the checks and balances of the Constitution of the Roman Republic.

The Roman Republic had three legislative assemblies that worked with the Roman Senate of the patrician class. These include:

- Centuriate Assembly (soldiers)
- Plebeian Council (plebeians)
- Tribal Assembly (patricians and plebeians)

The Senate and the assemblies worked together to appoint magistrates, enact laws, and resolve territorial holdings issues.

== Other types ==
=== Labor unions ===
Tricameral meeting arrangements are a growing trend in labor unions where some members will always be working on one of three shifts. Under such arrangements, each shift will have its own meeting, but the action of one meeting will have to be adopted by the other two.

=== Queen's University ===
The governing authority of Queen's University at Kingston principally follows a bicameral structure, split primarily between a Board of Trustees and a Senate, each of which has exclusive authority over non-academic and academic matters. Such arrangement is also common in several other Canadian universities, such as the University of Waterloo.

Queen's University additionally has a University Council with advisory and ceremonial functions, including appointing of the university Chancellor (a purely ceremonial role). Although the Council has no real power to govern the university, it has exclusive rights to determine its own composition and select its members, meaning it is not subordinate to the Board and/or Senate. The Council was made by the Parliament of Canada, which is thus the only body that can also dissolve it.

== See also ==
- Three estates
