= House of Bishops =

Anglican religious governing assembly

The House of Bishops is the third House in a General Synod of some Anglican churches and the second house in the General Convention of the Episcopal Church in the United States of America.

== Composition of Houses of Bishops ==
The composition of a House of Bishops varies from jurisdiction to jurisdiction. Typically, they consist of archbishops and/or Primates, diocesan bishops and sometimes suffragan and coadjutor bishops (who may, in turn, be elected as a fixed number, as happens in the Church of England). Houses of Bishops of Anglican Communion provinces are typically chaired by the Primate, Archbishop, or Presiding Bishop of the province, while in some provincial subdivisions of a Communion province, a House of Bishops is chaired by a provincial metropolitan.

== See also ==
- Diocesan synod
- General Synod of the Anglican Church of Canada
- General Synod of the Church of England
  - House of Bishops (Church of England)
