= Archbishops' Council =

UK organization

The Archbishops' Council is a part of the governance structures of the Church of England. Its headquarters are at Church House, Great Smith Street, London.

The council was created in 1999 to provide a central executive body to co-ordinate and lead the work of the church. This was a partial implementation of the recommendations of the report "Working Together as One Body" produced by Michael Turnbull (then Bishop of Durham) in 1994.

== Objectives and objects ==
The Archbishops’ Council has seven objectives.

1. A Younger Church: To double the number of children and young active disciples in the Church of England by 2030.

2. A More Diverse Church: To fully represent the communities we serve in age and diversity.

3. Revitalise Parishes: A parish system revitalised for mission so churches can reach and serve everyone in their community.

4. New Christian Communities: Creating 10,000 new Christian communities across the four areas of home, work / education, social and digital.

5. Missionary Disciples: All Anglicans envisioned, resourced, and released to live out the five marks of mission in the whole of life, bringing transformation to the Church and world. All local churches, supported by their dioceses, becoming communities and hubs for initial and ongoing formation.

6. Sustainability: A Church that cherishes God’s creation and leads by example in promoting sustainability.

7. Safety and Dignity: A Church that affirms the dignity of all people by being a safe place for all, especially children and vulnerable adults.

== Legal status and membership ==
The Archbishops' Council was established by the National Institutions Measure passed by the General Synod of the Church of England in 1998. It has its own legal identity and is, in addition, a charity.

The council is made up of:

- the Archbishop of Canterbury
- the Archbishop of York
- the prolocutors of the convocations of Canterbury and York
- the chairman and vice-chairman of the House of Laity of the General Synod
- two bishops elected by the House of Bishops of the General Synod
- two members of the clergy elected by the House of Clergy of the General Synod
- two lay people elected by the House of Laity
- one of the Church Estates Commissioners
- up to six other people jointly appointed by the two archbishops, with the consent of the General Synod. These appointees have a non-executive role and currently include:
  - John Spence
  - Maureen Cole
  - Mark Sheard
  - Matthew Frost
  - The Rev. Charlotte Cook
  - Joseph Diwakar

The archbishops of Canterbury and York are the joint presidents of the council, but the Archbishop of Canterbury normally chairs its meetings.

The council is one of the "National Church Institutions"; the others include the Church Commissioners, the Church of England Pensions Board and the General Synod.

== Committees and staff ==
The work of the council is assisted by a number of committees:

- Mission and Public Affairs Council (including the Hospital Chaplaincies Council)
- Board of Education
- Committee for Minority Ethnic Anglican Concerns
- Council for Christian Unity
- Central Council for the Care of Churches
- Committees of the Ministry Division
  - Committee for Ministry of and among Deaf and Disabled People
  - Deployment, Recruitment and Conditions of Service Committee
  - Theological Education and Training Committee
  - Vocation, Recruitment and Selection Committee
- Finance Committee
- Audit Committee

In 2006, the council employed about 250 staff. The senior posts include:

- Secretary-General to the Council and the General Synod
- Chief Education Officer
- Director of Mission & Public Affairs
- Head of Cathedral and Church Buildings
- Director of Ministry
- Director of Human Resources
- Head of Legal Office and Chief Legal Adviser to the General Synod
- Clerk to the Synod and Director of Central Secretariat

== Finances ==
The members of the council are also members and directors of the Central Board of Finance of the Church of England. Technically, the board of finance is a separate legal entity, however all major decisions are taken by members of the council in their capacity as the directors of the Board.

In 2006, the council had a budget of approximately £61 million, principally derived from the Church Commissioners (about £32 million) and contributions from each of the dioceses (£24.5 million).

Spending in that year included grants to the dioceses (£31 million), training clergy (both funding for colleges and allowances for individuals in residential training - £10 million), grants to organisation such as Churches Together, the Church Urban Fund and the World Council of Churches (£2.2 million), and housing assistance for retired clergy (£2.8 million).

== Notable members ==
- William Fittall, secretary-general from 2002 to 2015
- Philip Fletcher, 2007 to 2016
- David Lammy, 1999 to 2002
- William Nye, secretary-general from 2015-present
- Jayne Ozanne, 1999 to 2004
- Mark Russell, CEO of the Church Army, 2005 to 2011 and since 2015
- Glyn Webster, present
