= Channel Islands Measure 2020 =

Church of England measure

- Measure of the Church of England
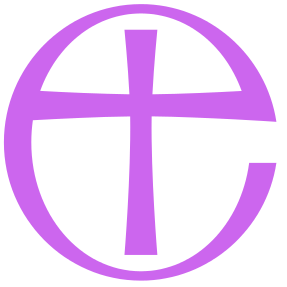
- General Synod of the Church of England
- Long title: A Measure passed by the General Synod of the Church of England to make provision for enabling the attachment of the Channel Islands to the diocese of Salisbury; to make further provision for the application of Church Measures to the Channel Islands; and to make further provision for Church representation for the Channel Islands
- Citation: 2020 No. 2
- Territorial extent: England (including the Crown Dependencies)

Dates
- Royal assent: 22 July 2020
- Commencement: 22 July 2020 (§1, §3); 19 July 2022, 2 September 2022 (§2, §4 in Jersey); 9 November 2022 (§2, §4 in Guernsey)

Status: Current legislation

Text of statute as originally enacted

Revised text of statute as amended

Text of the Channel Islands Measure 2020 as in force today (including any amendments) within the United Kingdom, from legislation.gov.uk.

The Channel Islands Measure 2020 (No. 2) is a Church of England measure passed by the General Synod of the Church of England transferring the Deanery of Guernsey and Deanery of Jersey from the Diocese of Winchester to the Diocese of Salisbury.

== Background ==
In March 2013 the Bishop of Winchester suspended the Dean of Jersey over safeguarding issues. The next month, he was reinstated and the Bishop issued an apology.

In June 2013, the Bishop of Winchester apologised to the victim for the handling of her case in 2008. And the next month, Anglican church members in the Channel Islands met in their deanery synod, to discuss concerns about their relationship with the Church of England, including whether the islands should stay in the Diocese of Winchester.

In November 2013, the Church of England announced that there would be no disciplinary action against any Jersey Anglican member, following an inquiry into the original abuse issue, which had been commissioned in In May 2013 and led by a senior judge, Dame Heather Steel.

In January 2014, some responsibilities for the Deaneries were transferred to the Diocese of Canterbury. In March, Anglican Churches in Jersey were told they would have to continue to pay their Parish Share to the Diocese of Winchester.

In total estimates for the costs of these inquiries ranged from £190,000 to £600,000 at that point.

In September 2019, the Church of England published a report laying out Salisbury as the best diocese for the Deaneries to be a part of, because there were good transport links between both airports and Southampton and Sarum College would allow for more training opportunities. The report also noted historical links between the Diocese of Salisbury and the Channel Islands deaneries: in 1496 the then Pope sought to establish a connection, and that the first bishop to visit the Islands was Bishop John Fisher of Salisbury in 1818.

== Passage ==
The measure fully transferring all responsibility to the Diocese of Salisbury for the two Deaneries was passed by the General Synod in October 2019.

The measure was approved by the Ecclesiastical Committee of Parliament. The measure was approved by the House of Commons through the Delegated Legislation Committee on 15th July 2020. The measure was approved by the House of Lords on 15th July 2020.

== Commencement ==
The legislation transferring the Deanery of Jersey was approved on 19 July 2022. This was registered by the Royal Court on 2 September 2022.

The Deanery of Guernsey was finally transferred on 9 November 2022 with the legislation maintaining certain ceremonial relationships between the Bishop of Winchester and the Elizabeth College.
