= Church assembly =

Church assembly may refer to:

- a gathering of a Church congregation for a Church service
- the former name of the General Synod of the Church of England#Church Assembly: 1919 to 1970
