= House of Clergy =

Middle house in the tricameral Church of England General Synod legislature

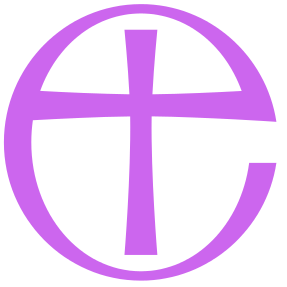
Church of England logo

The House of Clergy is the middle house in the tricameral Church of England General Synod legislature. It consists of representatives of the ordained clergy of the Church of England.

== Composition ==
The House of Clergy comprises ordained members of the Church of England below the rank of bishop. Members are elected by their fellow clergy to represent their individual Dioceses at their regional Diocesan Synod. Members are obliged to retire when they reach 70. The House of Clergy, like the House of Bishops and House of Laity, hold veto power over all proposed Church of England Measures and reports. An example of this was when the House of Clergy vetoed a report on homosexuals and same-sex unions. It comprises the Lower Houses of the Convocations of Canterbury and York.

== Election ==
Elections to the House of Clergy take place every five years with by-elections held to fill any vacancies that may arise between elections. In practice the members of the House of Clergy are identical to the members elected to the Convocations of Canterbury and York. In order to be elected to the House of Clergy, the person must be an ordained member of the Church of England. A clergyman or women must be elected by the Deanery Synod of the area which includes the parish that they are licensed to work in, to the Diocesan Synod. From there, they must be elected by the members of the Diocesan Synod to the House of Clergy. In 1987, following the decision to allow ordination of women as Deacons in the Church of England, women became eligible for election to the House of Clergy for the first time. Members can also be co-opted and with a limited number being appointed.

Membership consists of three elected representatives by each Diocese in the Province of Canterbury and the Province of York including the extraprovincial Diocese of Gibraltar in Europe and the Diocese of Sodor and Man (which only elects one member). Other members elected include one for the universities of Oxford, Cambridge, and London, one jointly for the universities of Durham and Newcastle, four elected by the other universities split between Canterbury and York and six Deans elected from Cathedrals, plus either the Dean of Jersey or the Dean of Guernsey. The appointed ex officio members are the three senior Chaplains of the British Armed Forces, the Chaplain-General of Prisons and two members selected by the Anglican religious orders.

== See also ==
- English Covenant
