= English Covenant =

Proposed UK Christian denomination, 1980

The English Covenant was a proposed merger in England of the Church of England, the Methodist Church, the United Reformed Church (URC), and the Moravian Church. First published as an ecumenical initiative in 1980 after extensive discussions in the 1970s, it eventually failed because the Church of England rejected the covenant in 1982.

In 1972, a Churches' Unity Commission was set up by church leaders. The commission published Ten Propositions on Visible Unity in 1976, and suggested the creation of the Churches Council for Covenanting (for Unity). Responding to this document, five churches agreed to proceed with a plan for unity – the Church of England, the Methodist Church, the URC, and the Moravian Church, and Churches of Christ (which merged with the URC in 1981). The plan was generally welcomed by the Methodist Church. The URC, an ecumenically spirited denomination created in the same year as the commission, approved the initiative and sought to reorganize itself accordingly up to 1982. However, in the same year, the General Synod of the Church of England failed to secure the required two-thirds supermajority in the House of Clergy, even though the other two chambers of the synod had approved the plan.

== See also ==
- Anglican Communion and ecumenism
- Churches Together in England
- Local ecumenical partnership
- Synod of Whitby (664)
- Westminster Assembly (1643 to 1653)
