= Rural dean =

Clerical title in some Christian churches

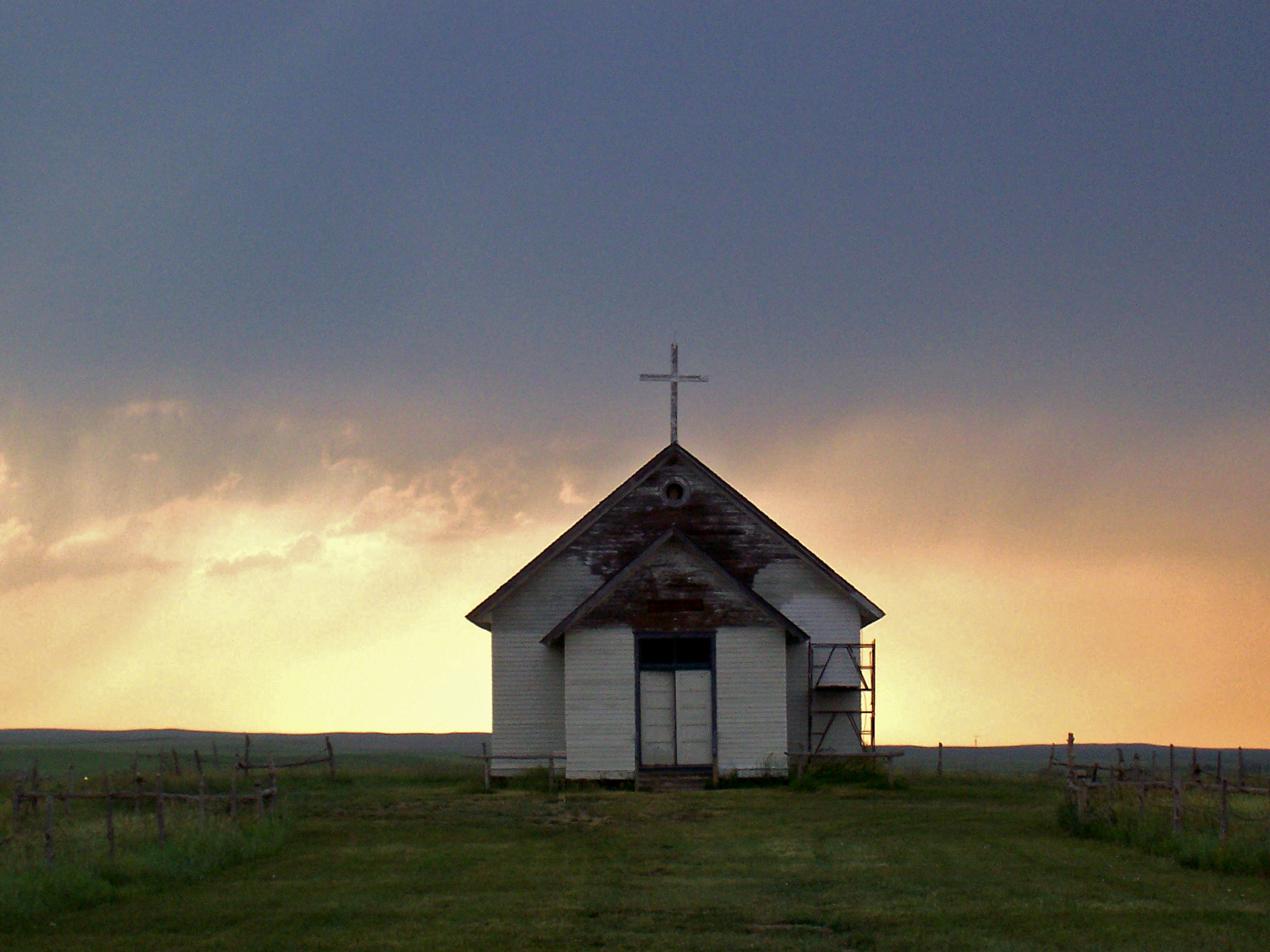
A rural church building on the western prairie of the United States

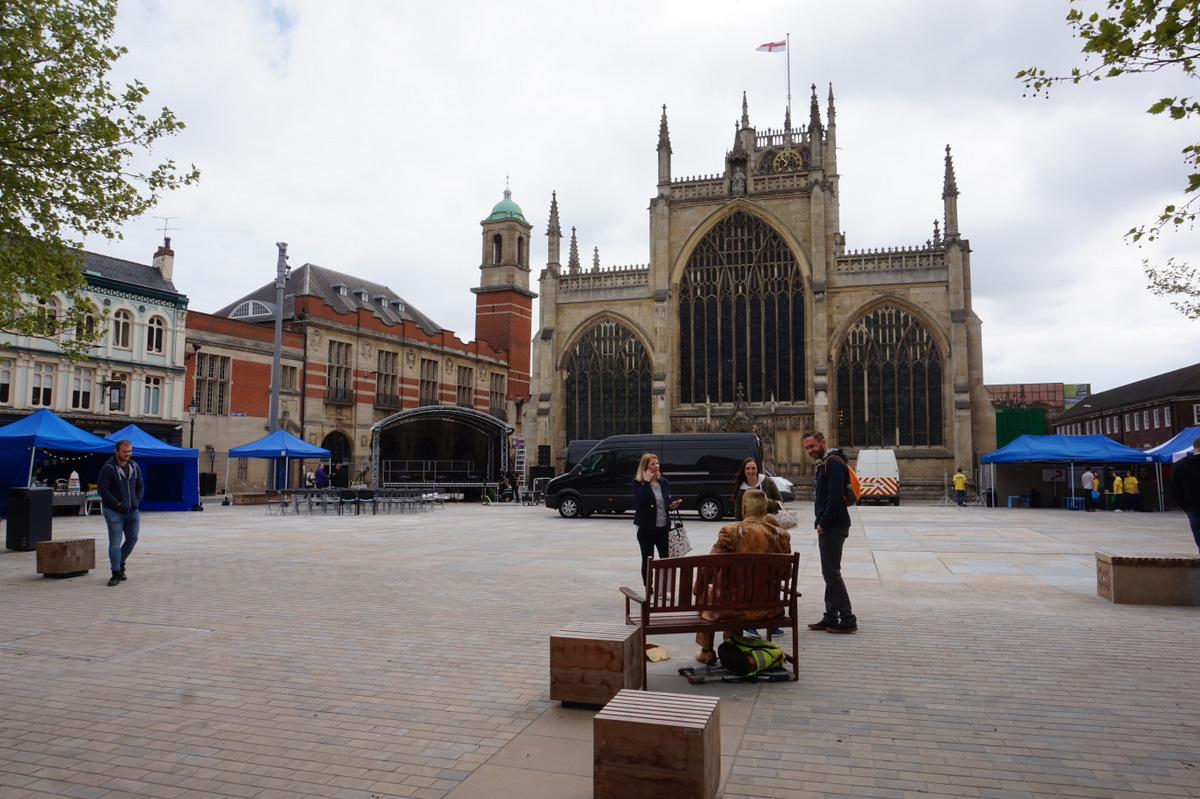
Hull Minster, see of the Rural Deanery of Hull

In the Catholic Church and the Anglican Communion as well as some Lutheran denominations, a rural dean is a member of clergy who presides over a "rural deanery" (often referred to as a deanery); "ruridecanal" is the corresponding adjective.

The adjective rural does not mean the role is restricted to the countryside, but distinguishes them from the deans of cathedral chapters, which were historically in cities. In some Church of England dioceses rural deans have been formally renamed as area deans.

== Origins ==
The title "dean" (Latin decanus) may derive from the custom of dividing a hundred into ten tithings, not least as rural deaneries originally corresponded with wapentakes, hundreds, commotes or cantrefi in Wales. Many rural deaneries retain these ancient names.

The first mention of rural deans comes from a law made by Edward the Confessor, which refers to the rural dean being appointed by the bishop "to have the inspection of clergy and people from within the district to which he was incumbent... to which end [he] had power to convene rural chapters." The first known rural dean is Robert de Eclesfield, who was appointed to the position in the diocese of York in 1148.

In medieval times rural deans acted as officers of the diocesan bishop and prepared business for the archdeacons to determine at their visitations. Archdeacons gradually took over most of the duties of rural deans and the office was allowed to become a sinecure by the 16th century.

== Roman Catholic usage ==
In the Roman Catholic Church, a dean or rural dean is a priest, usually pastor of a parish within the deanery area. The dean serves as a liaison between the diocesan bishop and the priests and parishes of the deanery, and chairs meetings of the clergy of the deanery. He serves many of the same functions, with somewhat less canonical authority, than an episcopal vicar does.

== Church of England usage ==
In the Church of England, the office of rural dean was revived by the Bishop of Norwich in 1836/1837. During the nineteenth century the office became more significant, and by the middle of the century rural deaneries were established in law, which also made provision for the modification of deanery boundaries, through the provisions of the Archdeaconries and Rural Deaneries Act 1874 (37 & 38 Vict. c. 63).

Canon C23 sets out the legal basis of the current role of rural deans. It sets out that rural deans will report to the bishop on significant matters, including illness and vacancies, and will investigate if there are problems in the parish. It also sets out that the rural dean will be joint chair, with the Lay Chair, of the deanery synod.

The current role of the rural dean has been summarised by the Diocese of Chichester as:

1. helping the Bishop in his episcopate and care of the deanery
2. providing a supportive and collaborative leadership for mission and ministry in the deanery
3. convening Chapter and co-chairing Deanery Synod and its work; being a friend to clergy and lay leaders of the parishes;
4. sometimes deputising for the archdeacon in his parish visitations

Rural deans also usually have a significant role during clergy vacancies, along with the churchwardens and are often involved in the selection of new clergy.

It is also becoming increasingly common to appoint assistant rural deans, to reduce the workload of rural deans. The Church of England (Miscellaneous Provisions) Measure 2000 2.12(4) allows the diocesan bishop to officially rename a rural dean as an area dean.

== See also ==
- Dean (religion)
- Archpriest for historical context
