= House of Bishops (Church of England) =

Religious governing assembly of the Church of England

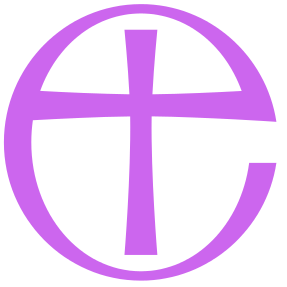
Church of England logo

The House of Bishops is the upper house of the tricameral Church of England General Synod legislature. It consists of all 42 Diocesan Bishops of the Church of England's Provinces of Canterbury and York as well as nine elected suffragan bishops. This is not to be confused with the Lords Spiritual, the most senior bishops in the Church of England sitting in the House of Lords ex officio.

== Duties and membership ==
The House of Bishops holds a veto power in the General Synod along with the House of Clergy and the House of Laity. An example of this was when the house vetoed a proposal allowing same-sex couples to receive blessings in Church of England parish churches. The House of Bishops also have distinct responsibilities in the General Synod. The House of Bishops meets twice in between Synod sessions. Any measure affecting Church of England services or administration of the sacraments also require final approval from the House of Bishops in addition to passing through the usual General Synod legislative procedure.

Under Standing Order 13 (a) of the Standing Orders of the House of Bishops, members of the public may attend meetings of the House provided that enough seating space is available for them to do so. However, under Standing Order 14 (a) of the House of Bishops Standing Orders, the Chair of the House of Bishops may move that the House go into a ‘Committee of the whole House’ which means that members of the public may not attend the meeting. In recent years, it has been the practice of whichever Bishop is chairing the meeting of the House to move Standing Order 14 so that the House may meet as a Committee in private.

The House of Bishops' membership comprises all 42 of the Church of England's diocesan bishops, including the two outside England: the Bishop of Sodor and Man and Bishop of Gibraltar in Europe. Suffragan bishops are also represented via the Bishop of Dover, acting as episcopal oversight on behalf of the Archbishop of Canterbury in the Diocese of Canterbury, the Bishop to the Forces and nine suffragan bishops elected by their fellow suffragan bishops.

In 2013, it was announced that eight female clergy would be elected regionally to take part in the House of Bishops' meetings as participant observers ahead of legislation to allow women bishops. These participant observers would remain a part of the House of Bishops until the House gained at least six female members. Six elected female suffragan bishops and the four Provincial Episcopal Visitors are entitled to attend and speak but not vote.

Bishops may hold their seat until they reach the age of 70, when they are obliged to step down as that is the retirement age for Church of England bishops.

== Participant observers ==
From 1 December 2013 until 30 November 2016, eight "participant observers", each elected by and from among the female "senior priests" of a specific region, attended meetings of the House of Bishops. The eight first elected were:

1. Viv Faull, Dean of York (North East region)
2. Annette Cooper, Archdeacon of Colchester (East Anglia region)
3. Rachel Treweek, Archdeacon of Hackney (South East region)
4. Nicola Sullivan, Archdeacon of Wells (South West region)
5. Christine Wilson, Archdeacon of Chesterfield (East Midlands region)
6. Joanne Grenfell, Archdeacon of Portsdown (South and Central region)
7. Jane Tillier, Diocesan Adviser for Women in Ministry, Diocese of Lichfield (West Midlands region)
8. Libby Lane, Dean of Women in Ministry (later Bishop suffragan of Stockport), Diocese of Chester (North West region)

During the period of this arrangement, two casual vacancies arose:

- After Treweek began to sit (following the 15 June 2015 confirmation of her election) in the House by right as Bishop of Gloucester, Rosemary Lain-Priestley, Associate Archdeacon of London, was elected to succeed her representing the South East region.
- When, in October 2015, Lane was elected to the House as a representation suffragan, her seat for the North West fell vacant.

It was announced in June 2016 that the "participant observers" arrangement would be replaced from 1 December 2016 with an arrangement whereby six female bishops suffragan would be "[given] rights of attendance".

== See also ==
- List of bishops in the Church of England
- House of Clergy
- House of Laity
