= General Synod of the Church of England =

Tricameral legislature of the Church of England

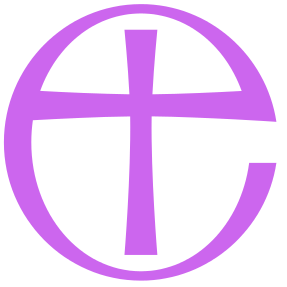

Type
- Type: Tricameral
- Chambers: House of Bishops; House of Clergy; House of Laity

Leadership
- Supreme Governor: Charles III
- Archbishop of Canterbury: Sarah Mullally
- Archbishop of York: Stephen Cottrell

The General Synod is the tricameral deliberative and legislative organ of the Church of England. The synod was instituted in 1970, replacing the Church Assembly, and is the culmination of a process of rediscovering self-government for the Church of England that had started in the 1850s.

== Church Assembly: 1919 to 1970 ==
Before 1919, any change to the church's worship or governance had to be by act of Parliament, which resulted in little being done. In 1919, the Convocations of the provinces of Canterbury and York adopted the constitution of the National Church Assembly proposed by the Representative Church Council and presented it to the king as an appendix to an address. The constitution as proposed to the sovereign was then recognised as already existing in the Church of England Assembly (Powers) Act 1919 (9 & 10 Geo. 5. c. 76), thus obtaining legal recognition of the assembly without implying that it had been created by Parliament or that Parliament could modify its constitution.

By means of the Church of England Assembly (Powers) Act 1919, Parliament then gave the assembly power to prepare measures which, once presented to Parliament and approved by a special procedure (see below), were to "have the force and effect of an Act of Parliament" on "any matter concerning the Church of England", and included the power to repeal or amend Acts of Parliament concerning the church. The preparation of such measures lay mainly with a joint Legislative Committee of the three houses of the assembly and this committee negotiated with the parliamentary Ecclesiastical Committee to reach an agreed form.

The act required that, after being passed by the assembly, the measure had to be examined by a joint committee of both Houses of Parliament which prepared a report to both houses – today known as the Ecclesiastical Committee. If then approved by each House, it was submitted to the Sovereign for royal assent. If MPs or members of the House of Lords were not content with a measure then they could vote to reject it, but not amend it. Once a measure had been agreed ("deemed expedient") by both Houses of Parliament, and received royal assent, it was (from 1926) printed with the acts of Parliament for the year in question.

== General Synod: from 1970 ==
=== Establishment ===
By the Synodical Government Measure 1969, the Church Assembly renamed and reconstituted itself as the General Synod of the Church of England. It also took over almost all the powers formerly exercised by the Convocations of Canterbury and York.

=== Membership ===
The synod is tricameral, consisting of the House of Bishops, the House of Clergy and the House of Laity. There are currently 467 members in total.

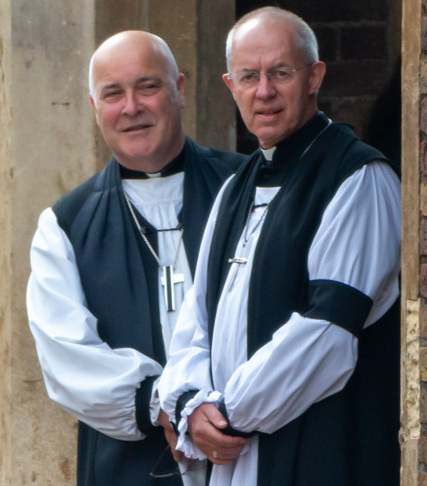
The joint presidents, the archbishops of York and Canterbury, pictured together in September 2022

The House of Bishops is made up of the 30 diocesan bishops in the Province of Canterbury, the 12 diocesan bishops of the Province of York, the Bishop of Dover (who functions as diocesan bishop of Canterbury, in the Province of Canterbury), and seven other suffragan bishops (four from Canterbury and three from York) elected by all suffragan bishops.

The House of Clergy comprises clergy elected from the following:

- 128 from the dioceses of the Province of Canterbury,
- 54 from the dioceses of the Province of York,
- 4 from among clergy teaching in universities or theological colleges. One must be from the Province of York (this arrangement replaced seats for specific universities as of the 2015 election),
- 6 deans elected from cathedrals, plus either the Dean of Jersey or the Dean of Guernsey,
- the 3 principal Anglican chaplains (and archdeacons) of the Armed Services, plus the Chaplain-General of Prisons (and Archdeacon), and
- 2 members of religious communities.

Members of the House of Laity are elected by lay members of the Deanery Synod in each Diocese every five years by a system of single transferable vote. There are:

- up to 170 members elected by the laity of the Province of Canterbury,
- up to 80 members elected by the laity of the Province of York,
- the Dean of the Arches,
- the Vicars-General of the Provinces of Canterbury and York,
- the three Church Estate Commissioners,
- the Chairman of the Central Board of Finance,
- the Chairman of the Church of England Pensions Board,
- the members of the Archbishops' Council who are communicants of the Church of England.

There are two or three synodical sessions per year (4–5 days each), one or two in Church House, Westminster, the other at the University of York, and each session is officially opened by the monarch. The Archbishops of Canterbury and York preside jointly.

=== Functions ===
The functions of the synod are:

- legislation:
  - to pass measures dealing with the government of the church and its institutions,
  - to pass canons, determining doctrine and the form of worship,
- to approve the liturgy and make other rules and regulations through Acts of Synod,
- to regulate relations with other churches,
- to consider and express their opinion on any other matters of religious or public interest, and
- to approve or reject the annual budget of the church

Measures or canons must be passed by a majority of the members of each house of the synod. Most other business can be passed by a majority of the members of the synod overall. However changes to church doctrine, rites and ceremonies, or the administration of the sacraments, can only be made in the form agreed by the House of Bishops. Also, changes in the services of Baptism or Holy Communion, as well as proposals for union with any other church, cannot be approved unless they have also been approved by a majority of the diocesan synods.

Some measures do not extend to the Diocese of Sodor and Man unless so provided by a measure passed by the Sodor and Man Diocesan Synod and approved by Tynwald. Measures are applied directly to the Channel Islands, in the legislation, under provisions of the Channel Islands Measure 2020.

The General Synod also elects some members of the Archbishops' Council.

Meetings of the General Synod have been allowed to be remote since the COVID-19 pandemic, under measures that were originally meant to be temporary but have been extended.

== See also ==
- Doctrine Commission: In existence between 1922 and 2010. Latterly commission of General Synod
- Enabling Act: Includes brief background of reasons which led to the act being passed
- English Covenant
- Faith and Order Commission: Replaced Faith and Order Advisory Group in 2010
- Church of England measure
  - List of Church of England measures
- Houses of Laymen
