= Diocesan synod =

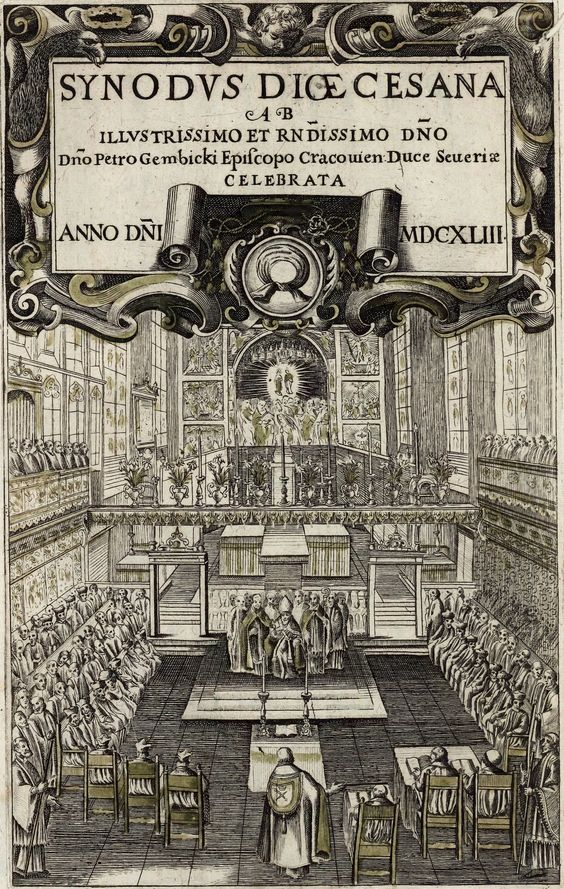
Anonymous Diocesan synod in Kraków's Saint Mary's Church

In the Anglican Communion, the model of government is the 'Bishop in Synod', meaning that a diocese is governed by a bishop acting with the advice and consent of representatives of the clergy and laity of the diocese. In much of the Communion the body by which this representation is achieved is called the diocesan synod. (In the Episcopal Church in the US, the corresponding body is called a diocesan convention.)

The precise composition of a diocesan synod is subject to provincial and local canon and practice.

== Church of England ==
In the Church of England diocesan synods exist under the terms of the Synodical Government Measure 1969.

A diocesan synod consists of three Houses, as follows:

- The House of Bishops consists of the diocesan bishop, together with any stipendiary suffragan bishops or area bishops, and assistant bishops as nominated by the diocesan bishop with the agreement of the archbishop.
- The House of Clergy consists of clergy representatives chosen by the clergy in each deanery synod, together with a number of ex officio members – any other assistant bishops working in the diocese; the dean of the cathedral; the archdeacons of the diocese; the clergy elected to the General Synod for the diocese (known as Proctors to the Lower House of Convocation), and some others.
- The House of Laity consists of representatives of the laity, elected from each deanery by the members of that deanery's deanery synod. There are also ex officio members, including the lay representatives elected by the Diocese to the General Synod.

Clergy and lay elected representatives are elected for a three-year term of office. The first diocesan synods met in 1970, and elections have been held every three years since, most recently in 2018. Election is by the members of the deanery synods of the diocese, and the number of representatives of each deanery is in proportion to the total number of 'members' of the churches in that deanery, compared with the diocese as a whole. The House of Clergy and the House of Laity should have approximately the same number of members. The method of election may be by simple plurality (i.e., first past the post) or by single transferable vote, and each diocesan synod may choose between these two.

In general the three Houses of the diocesan synod meet together, debate together and vote together, and a majority is assumed to be a majority of each of the three Houses. However, a vote by Houses can be requested, and in certain cases is required. In a vote by Houses, the consent of each of the three Houses is required in order for the assent of the Synod to be given. In addition, the diocesan bishop may declare that the House of Bishops shall only be deemed to have assented if the assenting majority includes the bishop. This means that the diocesan bishop may exercise a veto over the diocesan synod if they so wish.

== Aotearoa, New Zealand and Polynesia ==
The governing bodies of Episcopal Units in the three-tikanga church are each referred to by names appropriate to their tikanga's language: the New Zealand and Polynesia dioceses by diocesan synods, Te Pīhopatanga o Aotearoa by te rūnanganui ("great assembly") and the other pīhopatanga by hui amorangi. These smaller pīhopatanga's hui amorangi ("governing bodies") are not exactly equivalent to diocesan synods in that they are not fully independent of te rūnanganui.
