= Deanery synod =

In the Church of England and other Anglican churches, a deanery synod is a synod convened by the Rural Dean (or Area Dean) and/or the Joint Lay Chair of the Deanery Synod, who is elected by the elected lay members. The Synodical Government Measure 1969 makes it a statutory body.

A Deanery is a group of parishes within an Archdeaconry (an Archdeaconry forms part of the larger Diocese); members will elect the Diocesan representatives to the Houses of Clergy and Laity at the General Synod.

All Licensed Clergy in the Deanery area are automatically members of the Deanery Synod. Deanery Synods also have Lay Members who are elected every three years.

The Synod acts as an intermediary between the parochial church councils of each parish in its deanery and the synod of the diocese as a whole. In England its lay members also elect the deanery's lay representatives to its diocese's synod (every three years by either plurality or Single Transferable Vote) and its diocese's members of the House of Laity in the General Synod of the Church of England, every five years by a system of STV.
