= House of Laity =

Lower house in tricameral General Synod of the Church of England legislature

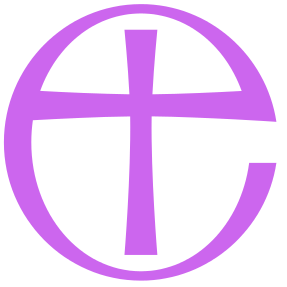
Church of England logo

The House of Laity is the lower house in the tricameral General Synod of the Church of England legislature. They are responsible for representing the laity of the Church of England in the legislature. They are indirectly elected every 5 years by members on the Church of England's electoral roll via the representatives on the Diocesan Synods.

== History ==
The concept of giving the laity a voice in the governance of the Church of England dated back to the English Reformation when King Henry VIII of England broke the Church of England away from the Roman Catholic Church. The doctrine of lay supremacy was one of the rationales for the breakaway. Initially the Members of Parliament in the House of Commons were used as the lay representatives as all Church of England legislature had to go through Parliament. However during the 20th century, Parliament focussed little time on Church of England matters. When the Church Assembly (predecessor to the General Synod) was established, it was decided that normal churchgoers would replace the House of Commons as the representatives of the laity; thus creating the House of Laity.

The House of Laity has had co-opted members since the passage of the House of Laity (Co-opted Members) Measure 1937 (1 Edw. 8 & 1 Geo. 6. No. 2), which allowed the co-option of ten members.

The House of Laity, along with the House of Bishops and House of Clergy, hold a veto over Church of England Measures and reports. An example of this was in 2012 when the House of Laity failed to reach the two-thirds majority needed to approve the ordination of women bishops despite the other Houses of the Synod approving it.

== Election ==
Members of the House of Laity are elected every five years. Despite their name, they are not directly elected by the Church of England's members. To be eligible for election a person has to be on the electoral roll of a Church of England parish church and be elected by their church's members or co-opted onto the parochial church council, then selected to represent the parish at the deanery synod. From there, they have to be selected to represent the deanery at the diocesan synod, from whose numbers the diocese's representative to the General Synod is elected. There has been criticism of this method of election with suggestions that it leaves the system open to influence from special interest groups. There is no maximum age limit to sit in the House of Laity however some members have voluntarily chosen not to stand for re-election when they reach 70 on the grounds that Church of England clergy are obliged to retire at that age.

All dioceses of the Province of Canterbury and the Province of York are represented with two representatives in the House of Laity. The Diocese of Sodor and Man is not represented in the House of Laity. However, the duties of the House of Laity insofar as measures extend to the Isle of Man are taken on by Tynwald from the diocesan synod.
