= Unregistered land in English law =

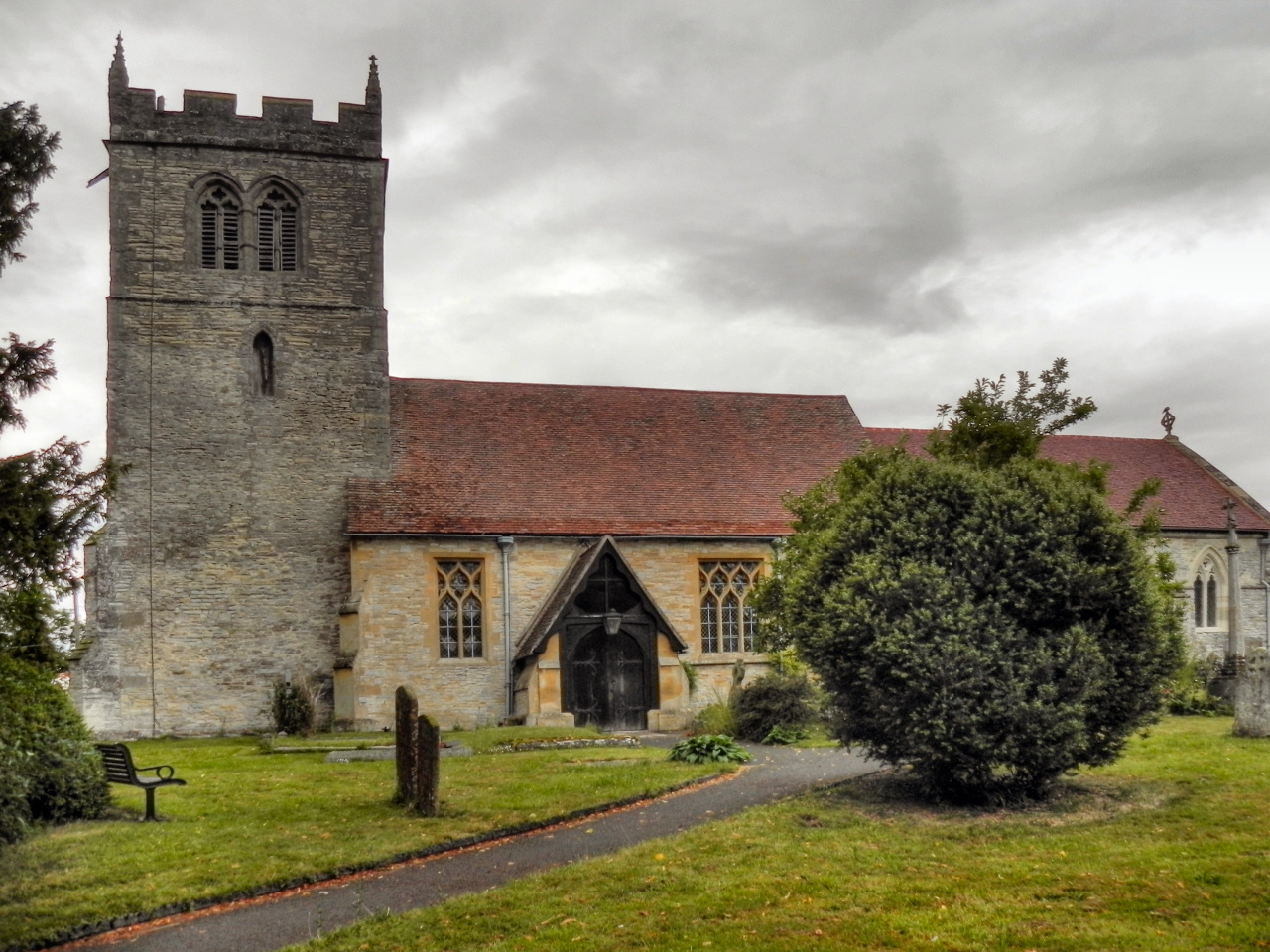
The Chancel Repairs Act 1932, requiring contributions for local church repairs, accelerated land registration because it always takes effect against unregistered land, but only with a notice on registered land after 2013. It was held compatible with the ECHR in Parish of Aston Cantlow v Wallbank.

Unregistered land in English law is land that has not been registered with HM Land Registry. Under the residual principles of English land law, for unregistered land proof of title is based upon historical title deeds and a registry for certain charges under the Land Charges Act 1972.

== Compulsion to register ==
In 2013, because registration of title was never made compulsory per se, 18 per cent of land in England and Wales remained unregistered. In 2019, the Land Registry stated that "14% of the freehold land of England and Wales remains unregistered." Only if a transaction identified in the Land Registration Act 2002 section 4 took place, as under the Land Registration Act 1925, would the land be compulsorily entered on the register. Such events have resulted in the amount of unregistered land decreasing by around 1 per cent a year. As of 2022, the amount of land unregistered in England and Wales stood at 12 per cent.

Voluntary registration is permitted, and initiatives encouraging large landowners to register their property helped reduce the proportion of unregistered land from about 50% in 2005 to roughly 20% in 2012.

As a result, when dealing with unregistered property, establishing the “root of title” and identifying any associated rights—such as easements or covenants—requires examining the relevant collection of title deeds, typically going back at least 15 years. Even when such property is sold and registration is triggered, a final review of the title deeds remains necessary.

== Priority of property rights ==
The first basic principle of unregistered land was that all legal property rights bound everyone, whether or not anybody knew about them. These would usually be in the deeds that were kept, though small interests like a lease of under three years would not because of its exemption from formality, as with registered land.

The second principle was that equitable proprietary rights bound everyone except a bona fide purchaser of the legal estate without any notice of the equitable interest. Being a bona fide purchaser was an "absolute, unqualified, unanswerable defence", so that the person with an equitable interest would only have an enforceable right against the traceable assets received in return for the land. Being a purchaser for value meant not receiving the property as a gift, and bona fide meant acting in good faith. In turn, good faith largely meant the same thing as buying the land without having any actual notice, and it not being reasonable to have known, about another person's equitable interest. According to the Law of Property Act 1925 section 199, and cases through the courts, buyers of land would be bound by prior equitable interests if the interest "would have come to his knowledge if such inquiries and inspections had been made as ought reasonably to have been made". So for example, in Kingsnorth Finance Co Ltd v Tizard, it was held that clothes of a divorcee being present in a home bound a bank's agent who inspected a property with notice of her equitable interest. The general scheme of the law was to do everything possible to ensure that people were not deprived of their stakes in their homes without their fully informed and true consent, yet it stopped short of simply determining that equitable rights were always binding.

== Land charges ==
On top of these basic rules, the Land Charges Act 1972, following predecessor the Land Charges Act 1925, required that some kinds of charges had to be entered on another special register of charges for unregistered land. According to section 2, a puisne mortgage (a second or third mortgage created after a property is already mortgaged) had to be registered before it would be binding, even though it had previously counted as a legal property right.

The other important kinds of charge that had to be registered are restrictive covenants and equitable easements, a right from part IV of the Family Law Act 1996, and an "estate contract" (i.e. either a future right to buy a property, or an option to buy). Without registration, those charges would be void, but once registered those charges would bind everyone. The registration would go against the name of the title holder, although this was sometimes prone to being confusing if people occasionally used different names (e.g. Francis or Frank). If an official search of the register did not reveal any titles, then the purchaser would gain good legal rights.

One glaring injustice, however, was that the House of Lords held the registration rules to be strict. In Midland Bank Trust Co Ltd v Green, Walter Green gave his son, Geoffrey an option to buy the property, but did not register it. Then Walter changed his mind, and knowing that Geoffrey had not registered this estate contract, he transferred the property to his wife, Evelyne, for £500 to defeat the agreement. Although the purchaser had actual notice of Geoffrey's equitable interest, it did not matter because it was not registered. In another example, it was held in Lloyds Bank v Carrick that a person in actual occupation of a home, who had an unregistered right to buy the home, could not claim an overriding interest (as would have been possible in registered land) because the only source of the interest was the estate contract, and without registration this was void.

The anomalies of the system were always acknowledged, and so it was simply hoped that unregistered land would dwindle away. The solution, perhaps simpler, of passing legislation requiring that everything was compulsorily registered, was not yet taken.

== See also ==
- English land law
