= Jonas Pilling =

British vicar

- Reverend
- Church: 1881 Christ Ch, Heaton Norris; 1890 St Augustine, Scisset; 1892 St Mary, Penwortham; 1896 St Anne, Lydgate; 1898 St Laurence, Chorley; 1901 St Paul, Withnell; 1904 St Jude, Preston; 1905 St Andrew, Steeple Gidding; 1905 St Mark, Leeds Rd, Hudd

Orders
- Ordination: 1883 (priest) by Bishop of Manchester

Personal details
- Born: 1855 Farnworth, Lancashire, England
- Died: 28 February 1926 (aged 70–71) Huddersfield, Yorkshire, England
- Education: Hatfield Hall, Durham
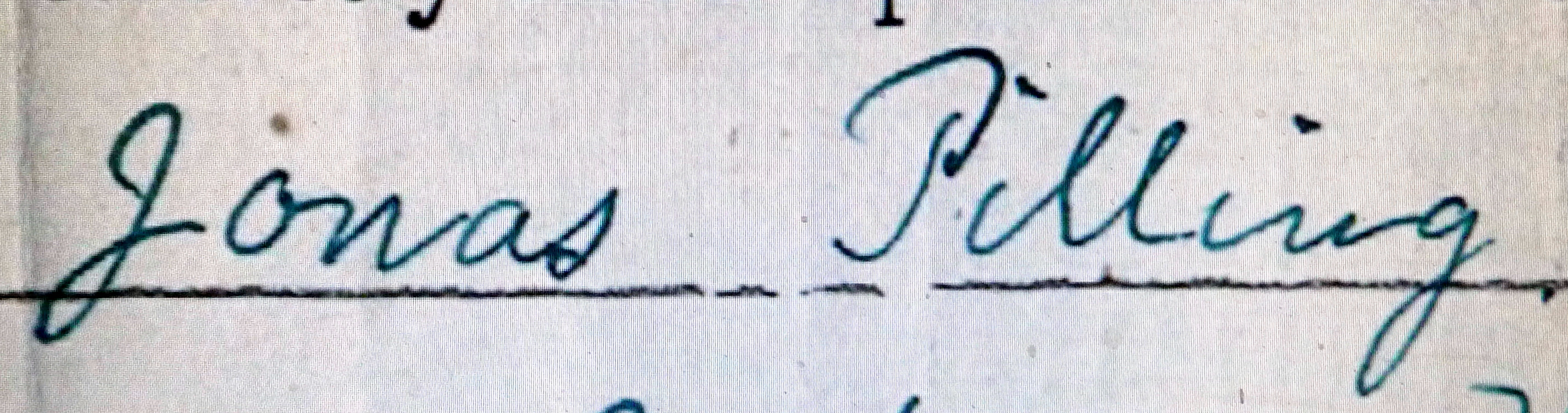
- Signature

Jonas Pilling (1855 – 28 February 1926) was vicar of the former Church of St Mark, Old Leeds Road, Huddersfield, West Yorkshire, England, from 1905 to 1926. He was the notorious subject of many newspaper articles about the fourteen-year dispute between Pilling and his congregation, the absence of churchwardens, other officials and choir, the dwindling of his congregation and the dereliction of the church building. This occurred in an industrial environment of great poverty, where there was "plenty of scope for church work". At the 1921 Bishop's Commission, he mentioned his fear of "plottings".

However, Pilling was a Manchester-born man, assuming a position of respect in Huddersfield, in an era of powerful inter-city rivalries. He came from a tradition of cotton-spinning, whereas Huddersfield was a wool town; culture and dialect differed. He was studious; he was an Exhibitioner and a Master of Arts, whereas his flock included some of the most deprived people in the area. Although his relationship with his congregation deteriorated disastrously over sixteen years, the Bishop of Wakefield failed to assist either Pilling or his flock during that period.

== Life ==
Pilling's father was Richard Pilling (born 1829), a "hasher" or sizer of cotton yarn from Sharples, Bolton. His mother was Ann Ashworth (born 1828), from Halliwell, Greater Manchester. His parents married in Manchester in 1853. He was born in 1855, the second of four children, in Farnworth. In 1861 he was living at 153 Bridgewater Street, Farnworth. (Note: Marriages Sep 1853 Ashworth, Ann and Pilling Richard, Manchester vol8d p128. Births Mar 1855 Pilling Jonas Bolton Vol8c p242) By 1871 Jonas was a pupil teacher, living with his parents at 39 Manchester Road, Kearsley, Bolton. Pilling died at St Mark's vicarage in Huddersfield on 28 February 1926, aged 70 years. He died of carcinoma of the colon and myocarditis, while still vicar of St Mark's. His landlady Elizabeth Margaret Banforth was present at his death. (Note: Deaths Mar 1926 Pilling Jonas 70 Huddersfield vol9a p429. The death certificate says: 28 February 1926, 38 Bath St, Jonas Pilling, male, 70 years, Vicar of St Marks Huddersfield, (1) carcinoma of colon (2) myocarditis, Elizabeth Margaret Banforth of 38 Bath Street Huddersfield present at the death.) He left £8,255 gross; £4,740 net (equivalent to £250,000 in 2025). He had formerly been curate of Penwortham church, and he was buried in the graveyard there at 2 pm on Wednesday 3 March 1926.

== Work ==
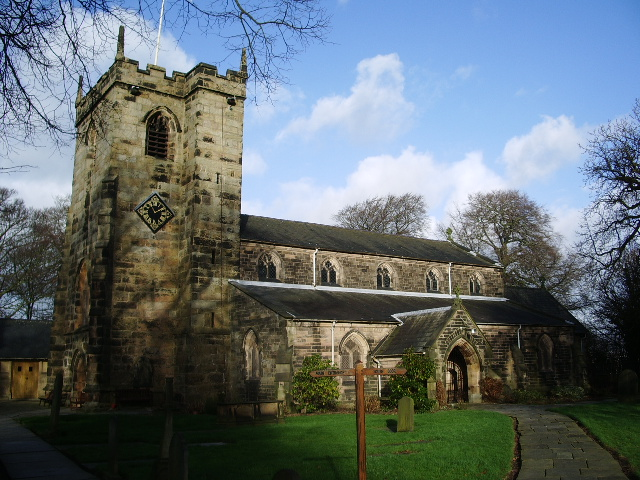
St Mary's, Penwortham, where Pilling is buried

He was a Theology Exhibitioner of Hatfield Hall, Durham, and a Licentiate of Theology 1881. The 1881 Census shows him as a student in theology, aged 25 and single, boarding at Leigh Bank, Lees Road, Saddleworth, Yorkshire. He gained his BA in 1882, and his MA in 1893. He was ordained deacon in 1881, and priest in 1883 by the Bishop of Manchester. He was curate of Christ Church, Heaton Norris 1881–1890; of St Augustine, Scissett, Yorkshire 1890–1892, where he described himself as "curate in charge of Skelmanthorpe"; of St Mary's Church, Penwortham 1892–1894; of St Anne's Lydgate, Greater Manchester 1896–1898. He was curate of St Laurence's Church, Chorley 1898–1901. He was curate of St Paul, Withnell 1901–1904, and of St Jude, Preston, Lancashire 1904–1905. The 1901 Census finds him at age 45 still single and describing himself as a clergyman, with his father at 48 Tithebarn Road, Southport. He was rector of St Andrew's Church, Steeple Gidding briefly from January 1905.

He became vicar of St Mark's, Old Leeds Road, Huddersfield, in 1905, and remained in the post until 1926 when he died. (Note: See Jonas Pilling's death certificate in note above) His patrons were the Trustees. In 1907 his fees were £4, his ecclesiastical commission was £192, his gross income was £196, and St Mark's parish population was 3403; it had risen to 4000 by 1908. The 1911 Census finds him still single at age 55, living with a servant at 38 Bath Street, Huddersfield. This may have been St Mark's vicarage, as it had seven rooms. He describes himself as a clerk in holy orders for the Church of England. On Thursday 27 August 1925 he officiated at Edgerton Cemetery, Huddersfield, at the funeral of twenty-eight-year-old gunner Walter Wood, who had tragically died in initially mysterious circumstances six days after he had enlisted. It was later learned that the soldier died of a misdiagnosed ulcer which had ultimately suffocated him.

== Deadlock at St Mark's ==
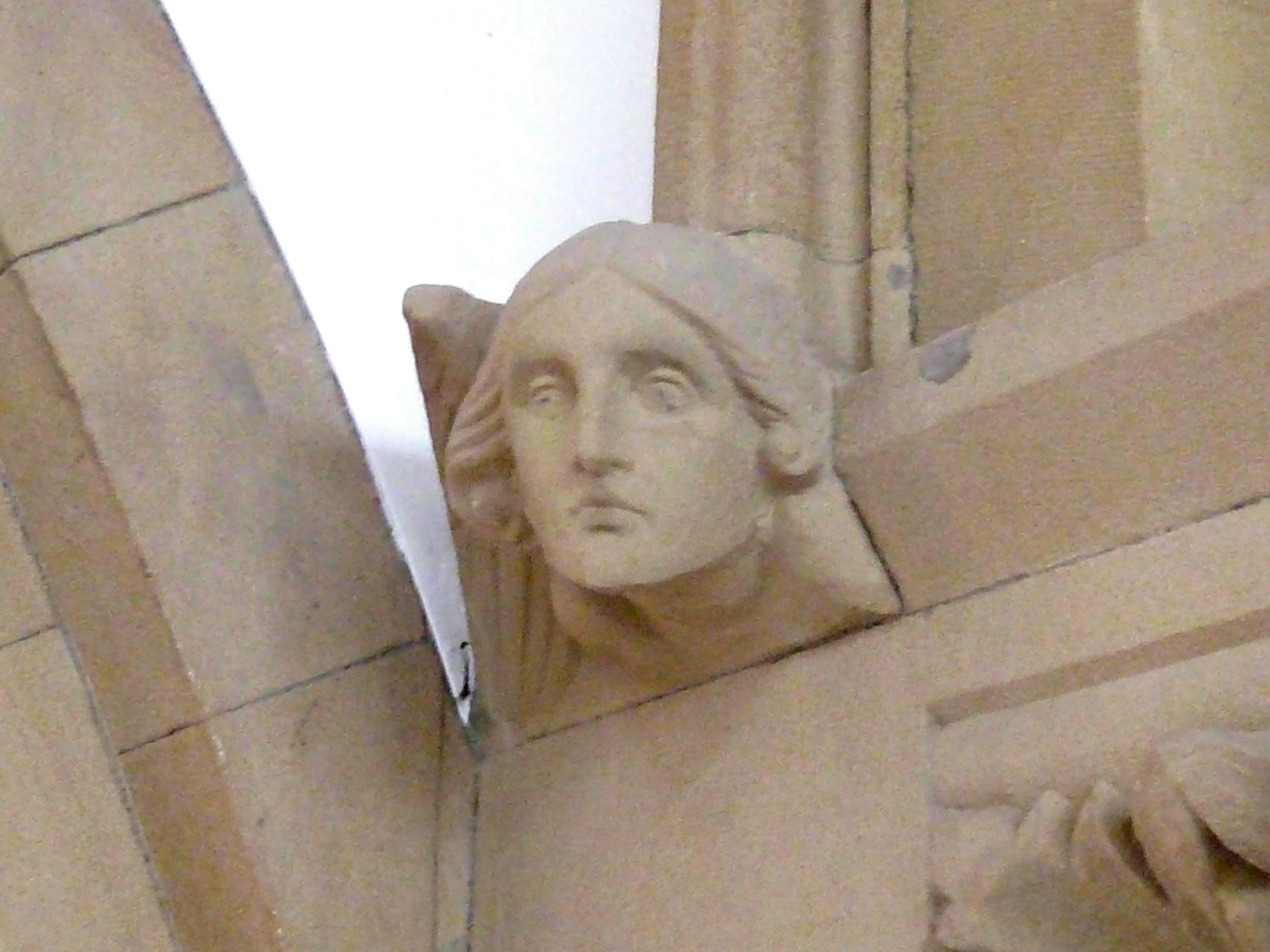
Angel on chancel arch, directly above former site of pulpit of St Mark's

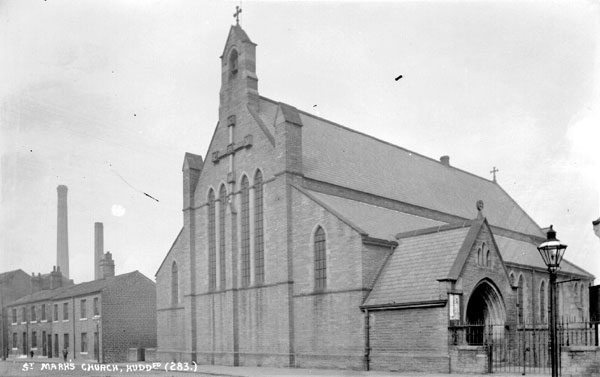
St Mark's before 1907

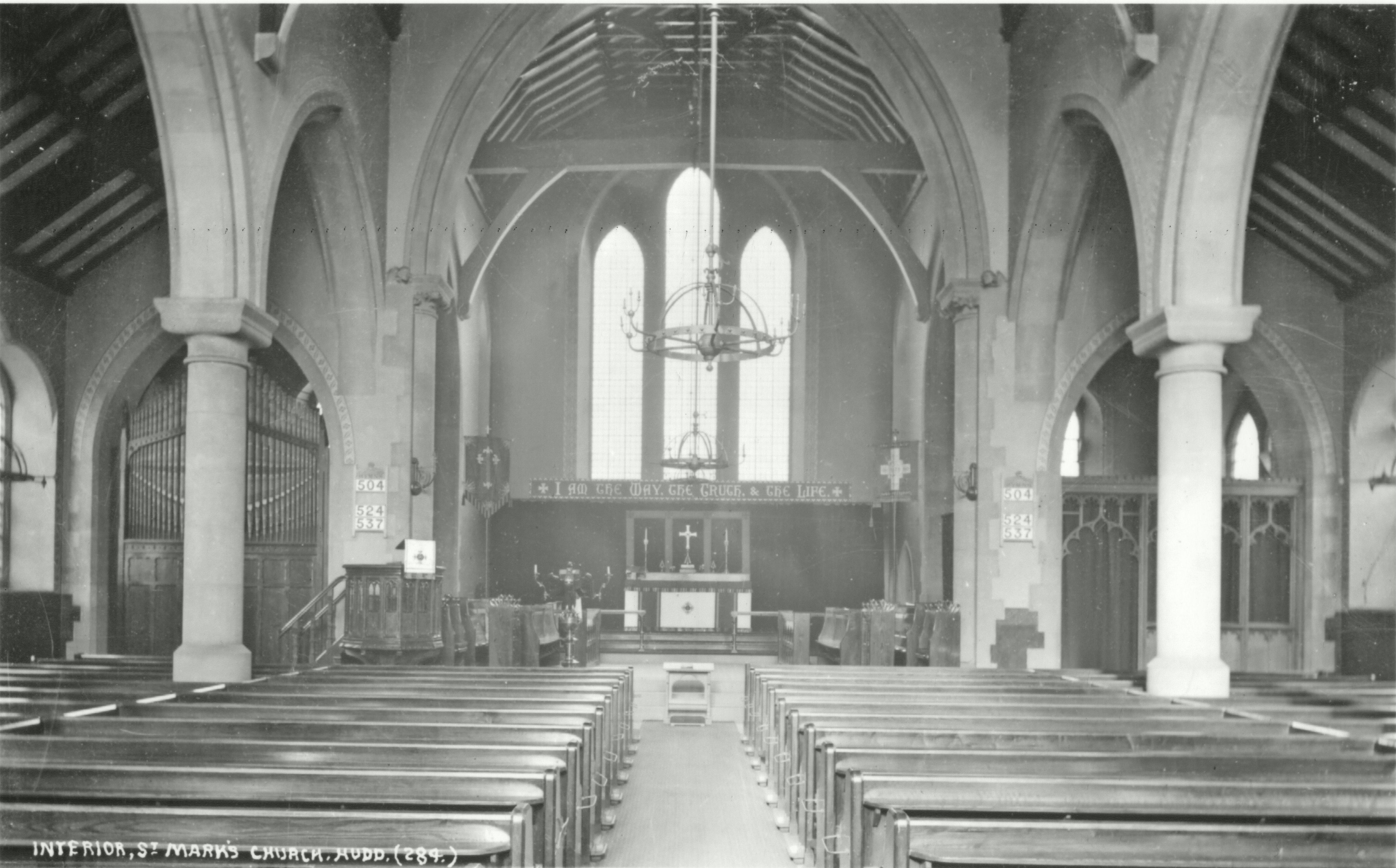
St Mark's before 1907

In 1907 there was a dispute between the churchwardens and the vicar Reverend Pilling. On Monday 6 May 1907, the Aberdeen Journal reported:

"After evensong at St Mark's Church, Huddersfield, last night, the whole of the voluntary Church officers – comprising churchwardens and sidesmen – walked out of the church in a body, all having resigned their positions owing to disputes with the vicar, Rev. J. Pilling, over questions of authority. The retiring officers refused to stand again, and, although three vestry meetings have been had since Easter, no successors have been elected. The vicar's warden, Henry Kilburn, has received a letter from the secretary of the Diocese of Wakefield, advising the wardens that they must continue in office until their legal successors are appointed."

The Leeds Mercury put it thus:

"It is quite evident that after the archdeaconal visitation, St Mark's Church, Huddersfield will be without church officers, for at present there are no signs of an amicable settlement with respect to the alleged differences between the vicar (the Rev. J. Pilling) and some of his parishioners. The annual vestry last week ended in a deadlock, as the outgoing officers declined reappointment, and although the vicar nominated Mr J. W. Mather, the choirmaster, as his warden, the church officers objected, on the ground that he was a paid official. The parties are apparently at loggerheads, for Thursday's meetings, one convened by the vicar, and the other by the churchwardens, Messrs H. Kilburn and A. Lawton, ended without anything having been done. It is stated that the patron of the living has been appealed to, and also the rural dean. Will the Bishop interfere? The vicar in conversation with a Press representative yesterday, when asked for his version of the affair, simply replied, "I have nothing to say on the matter," but he added that he had not read the report of the meeting called by the churchwardens, and he did not intend to do so. Mr H. Kilburn, the vicar's warden, would only state that he thought that sufficient publicity had been given to the state of affairs in the newspapers to justify the Bishop in holding an enquiry. At the meeting convened by the vicar, there was only a small attendance. The vicar presided, and amongst those present were the churchwardens, Captain Elcombe of the Church Army, and Mr J. Lockwood, a sidesman."

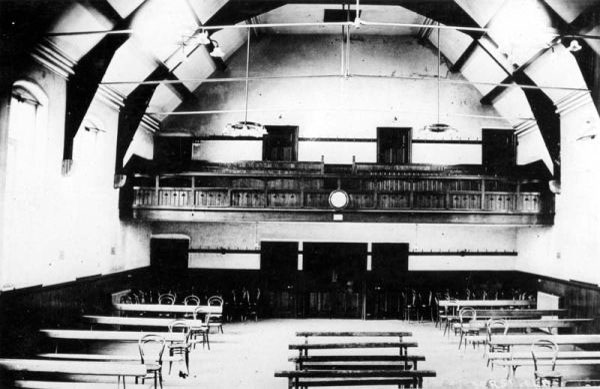
Interior of St Mark's Sunday school 1880s: closed when there was "plenty of scope for church work"

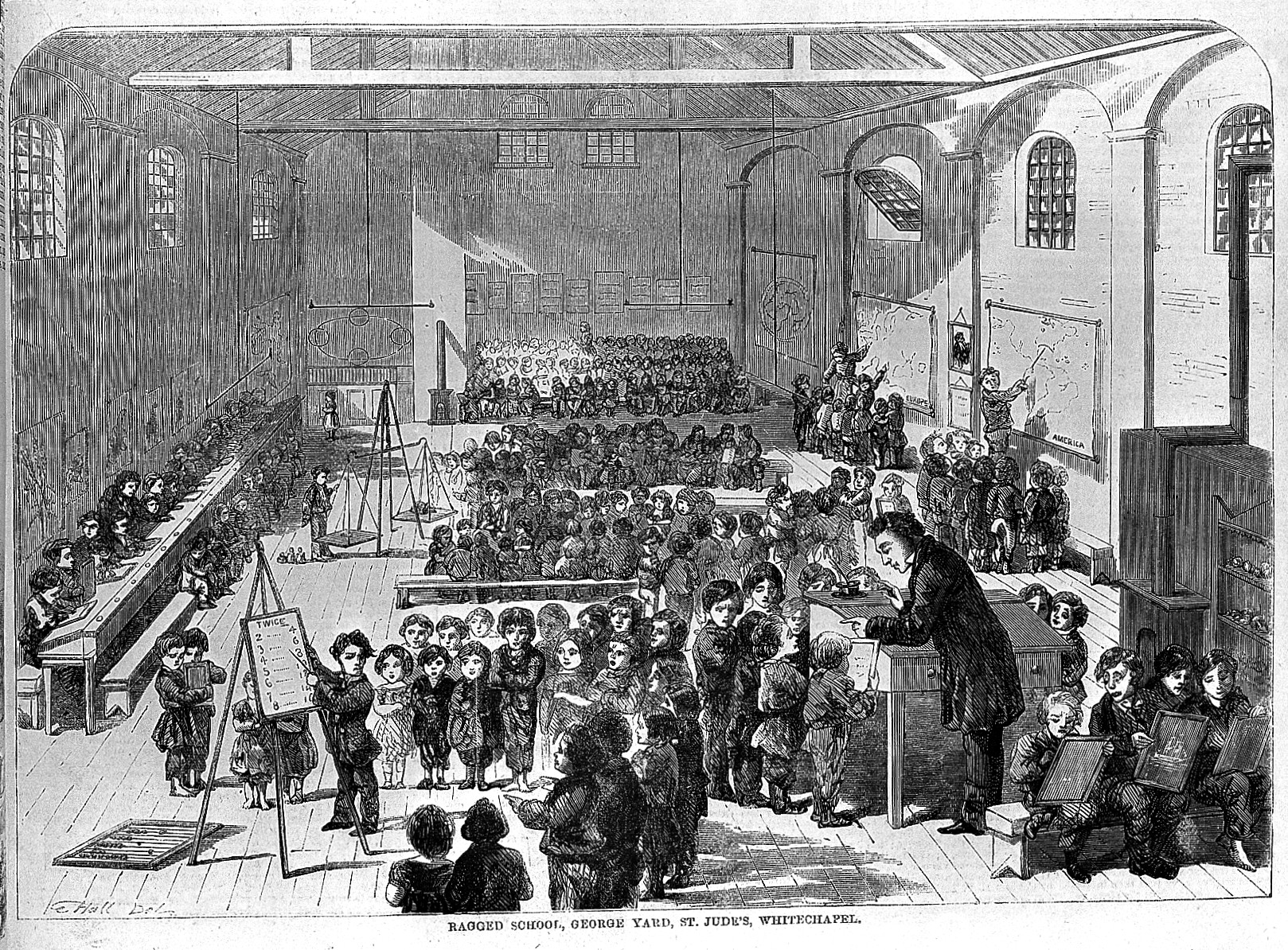
A 19th century ragged school

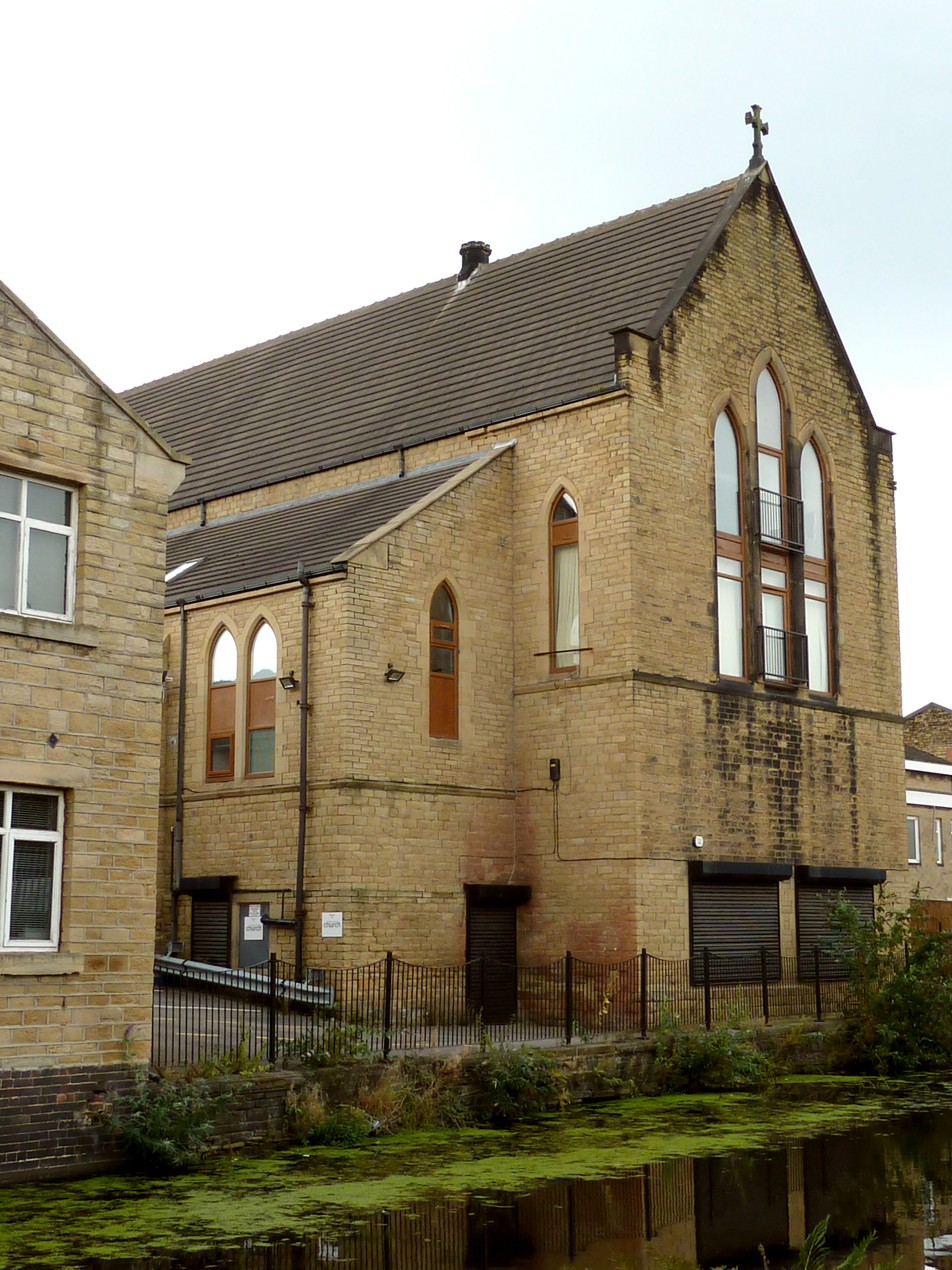
Doorways to former vestries below chancel

On 23 April 1908 the Yorkshire Evening Post reported that the vicar was still unable to persuade parishioners to volunteer themselves as churchwardens, and that "from what transpired today, there seems but slight prospect of an immediate improvement in the situation." The vicar had given notice of the meeting at twelve noon that day, but his notice attracted only four reporters and one choir member. The vicar did not enter the vestry but called the chorister out into the churchyard and asked him to inform the reporters that there was to be no vestry meeting. The vestry and the church gates were locked by 12.15 pm. In June 1908 the choir could not get a conference with the vicar, so they "unanimously resolved they would go out in a body" and resigned in July. The Cornishman published the following explanation on 30 April 1908:

"A deplorable deadlock, which is having bad results for both the church and the people, exists in the parish of St Mark's Huddersfield, where the Rev. J. Pilling is vicar. At the annual vestry a year ago, a dispute arose between the vicar and the church officials. It was alleged that Mr Pilling in certain matters had ignored the churchwardens, that he had stopped the publication of the parish magazine, discontinued the morning Sunday school, and that he took no notice of the invitation extended to him to preside at a congregational tea. At the request of the vicar the Sunday school superintendent resigned, and his example was followed by other teachers. The churchwardens declined to be again nominated, and other members of the congregation refused to stand. Since that time the rev. gentleman has carried on the parish work practically single-handed, and has enlisted the services of choir boys to make collections in the church. It was hoped by those interested in the church that some understanding might be arrived at between the congregation and vicar at this year's vestry, and the Bishop of Wakefield expressed his willingness to preside and endeavour to bring about a more satisfactory state of affairs. These hopes, however, were disappointed. Last Sunday morning the vicar posted up a written notice (signed by himself only) in the church porch, that the annual vestry would be held at noon. Those who attended were four reporters and a member of the choir who is not a parishioner. Upon ascertaining the nature of the gathering when in the churchyard the vicar returned home without putting in an appearance at the vestry. The parish is a thickly-populated one, and the population consists of poor working-class people. The church and Sunday school were formerly in a flourishing condition, but the congregation and the number of scholars is fast dwindling away in the unhappy condition of things."

On Thursday 15 April 1909 Reverend Pilling presided over a vestry meeting comprising one parishioner, Mr J. Lockwood, and four representatives of the Press. Pilling convened the meeting, then asked whether there was any nomination for churchwarden. There was no reply, so he announced the end of the meeting. Lockwood asked for the balance sheet, and Pilling replied that it would be "posted on the church door". By 1909 most of the congregation had left due to poor community relations. The Leeds Mercury commented, "The parish of St Mark embraces a poor neighbourhood, in which there is plenty of scope for church work."

In 1910 Pilling's housekeeper at St Mark's vicarage was looking for another post, for some reason. Referring to an incident of February 1912 between Pilling and a housekeeper, The Times printed the following:

[...] a case in Huddersfield County Court yesterday, in which the Rev. Jonas Pilling, vicar of St. Mark's Church, Huddersfield, was sued by his late housekeeper, Miss Lily Jane Puttock, for £3 16s. 8d. for "wages and board in lieu of notice." The plaintiff stated that she entered the service of the defendant in February last as lady housekeeper and was summarily dismissed on May 21. The only complaint the defendant had made was that she should get up earlier in the morning, as he wanted his breakfast earlier.

An annual vestry meeting was scheduled for Tuesday 25 March 1913, but only two news reporters attended. The vicar was in the church, but no business was transacted. At 10.45 on Sunday 12 April 1914 the annual vestry meeting appointment was attended by the verger and several representatives of the Press, but the vicar Rev. J. Pilling "did not enter the vestry". When the verger told him that no parishioner was present, Pilling left. On 26 April 1916, the Daily Gazette for Middlesbrough reported that as of 1916 no parishioners had attended any vestry meeting for seven successive years, and that the dispute "is apparently as far from settlement as ever. Since the dispute the church has been without officers, and the congregation is very small."

=== Bishop of Wakefield's commission ===
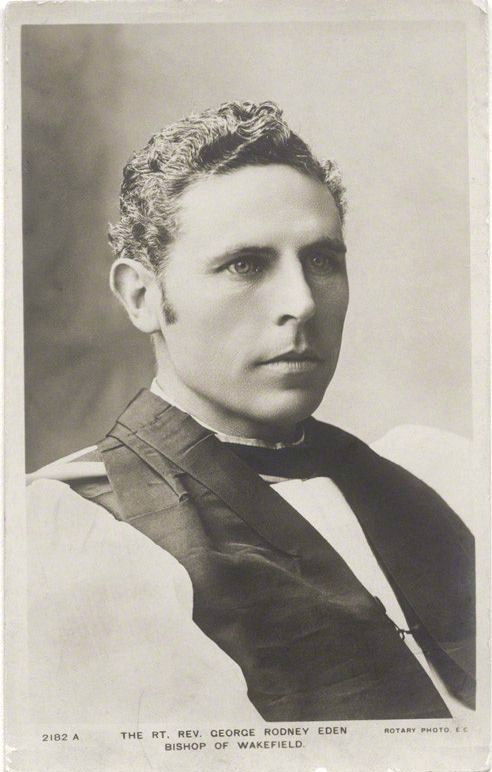
Rodney Eden, Bishop of Wakefield

In 1910 the Bishop of Wakefield's Commission recommended that "St Mark's shall cease to exist as a separate parish and that it shall be taken over by Huddersfield Parish Church as a mission church." However subsequent events show that no action was taken at that time. The situation continued until Wednesday 20 April 1921, when the Bishop's Commission was convened again by registrar W. H. Coles at Huddersfield "to investigate and report on the desirability of uniting the benefices of Huddersfield Parish Church and St Mark's Church, Lowerhead-row [now Old Leeds Road], the latter of which is alleged to be in an almost derelict condition." The small attendance and lack of churchwardens since 1906 was noted.

Pilling was summoned to the meeting, and said that "St Mark's parish had been thrust out of the Parish Church parish on account of its poverty. The Parish Church had never done anything for them, any more than the Bishop had. For fifteen years he had never had a holiday. He had lived and slept in the town every day and night. He had to be on the look out for these schemes and plottings." When questioned, he admitted that there had been no attendance at vestry meetings, although they had been advertised.
