= Puisne =

Legal term for inferior rank

Puisne (/ˈpjuːni/; from Old French puisné, modern puîné, 'later born, younger' (and thence, "inferior") from late Latin post-, 'after', and natus, 'born') is a legal term of art used mainly in British English meaning 'inferior in rank'.

== Judicial usage ==
The judges and barons of the national common law courts at Westminster, other than those having a distinct title, were called puisne. This was reinforced by the Supreme Court of Judicature Act 1877 following which a "puisne judge" is officially any of those of the High Court other than the Lord Chancellor, the Lord Chief Justice of England and the Master of the Rolls (plus the abolished positions of Lord Chief Justice of the Common Pleas, and the Lord Chief Baron of the Exchequer).

Puisne courts existed as lower courts in the early stages in the judiciary in British North America, in particular Upper Canada and Lower Canada. The justices of the Supreme Court of Canada other than the Chief Justice are still referred to as puisne justices.

== Puisne mortgages ==
In England and Wales, a puisne mortgage is a mortgage over an unregistered estate in land where the mortgagee (lender) does not take possession of the title deeds from the mortgagor (borrower) as security. A puisne mortgage may be registered with HM Land Registry as a Class C(i) Land Charge under the Land Charges Act 1972, although even if such a mortgage is registered it will not necessarily be enforceable. Puisne mortgages are generally a second or subsequent mortgage, and in the event of default of the mortgagor generally rank in the order of registration, not in the order in which they were created.

== See also ==
- Glossary of land law
