= Vestry =

Parish committee

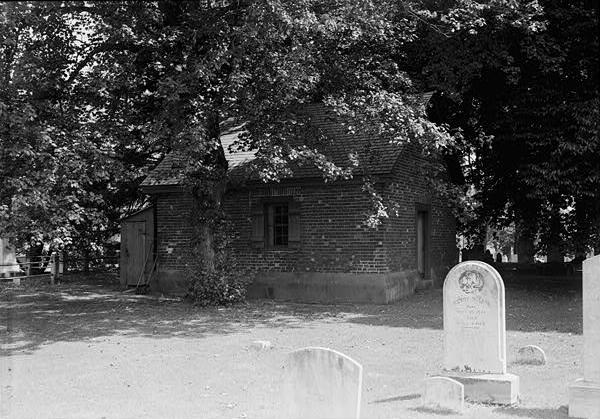
St. George's Parish Vestry House built in 1766 at Perryman, Maryland

A vestry was a committee for the local secular and ecclesiastical government of a parish in England, Wales and some English colonies. At their height, the vestries were the only form of local government in many places and spent nearly one-fifth of the budget of the British government. They were stripped of their secular functions in 1894 (1900 in London) and were abolished in 1921.

The term vestry remains in use outside of England and Wales to refer to the elected governing body and legal representative of a parish church, for example in the American and Scottish Episcopal Churches.

== Etymology ==
The word vestry comes from Anglo-Norman vesterie, from Old French vestiaire, ultimately from Latin vestiarium 'wardrobe'.

In a church building a vestry (also known as a sacristy) is a secure room for the storage of religious valuables and for changing into vestments. The vestry meetings would traditionally take place here, and became known by the name of the room.

== Overview ==
For many centuries, in the absence of an incorporated city or town council, the vestries were the sole de facto local government and presided over communal fundraising and expenditure until the mid or late 19th century under local established Church chairmanship. They were concerned with the spiritual and physical welfare of parishioners and their parish amenities, both secular and religious, by collecting local taxes and taking responsibility for functions such as the care of the poor, the maintenance of roads, minor law enforcement, civil registration, and maintenance of the church building, etc. However, more serious punitive matters were dealt with by the manorial court and hundred court, or the Justices of the Peace. The functions could vary from parish to parish depending on accepted custom and necessity and the willingness of the community to fund them. This was because their power derived initially from custom and was only occasionally ratified by the common law or asserted in statute. However during the Tudor period (1485–1603), parish vestries were given increased statutory duties: for example, the compulsory parish register of baptisms, marriages and burials was introduced in 1538, and under the Highways Act 1555, the vestries became responsible for the upkeep of roads in the parish. The Tudor poor laws, a series of laws introduced in this period, made vestries responsible for the care of the poor of the parish. At the high point of their powers before removal of Poor Law responsibilities in 1834, the vestries spent not far short of one-fifth of the budget of the British government.

During the 19th century, their secular functions were gradually eroded, and finally in 1894 (1900 in London) the secular and ecclesiastical aspects of the vestries were separated. The vestry's remaining secular duties were transferred to newly created parish councils. Their ecclesiastical duties remained with the Church of England, until they were abolished and replaced by parochial church councils (PCCs) in 1921. This secularisation of local government was unsuccessfully opposed by administrations of the Conservative Party led by Lord Salisbury and several high church Liberal politicians from 1895 to 1900.

The only aspect of the original vestry remaining in current use is the annual meeting of parishioners, which may be attended by anyone on the local civil register of electors and which has the power to appoint churchwardens. A right to tax by a PCC for church chancel repairs remains as to liable (apportioned) residents and businesses across an apportioned area of many church parishes, in the form of chancel repair liability however, in some areas no such further taxation replaced tithes.

== Vestry committees in England and Wales ==
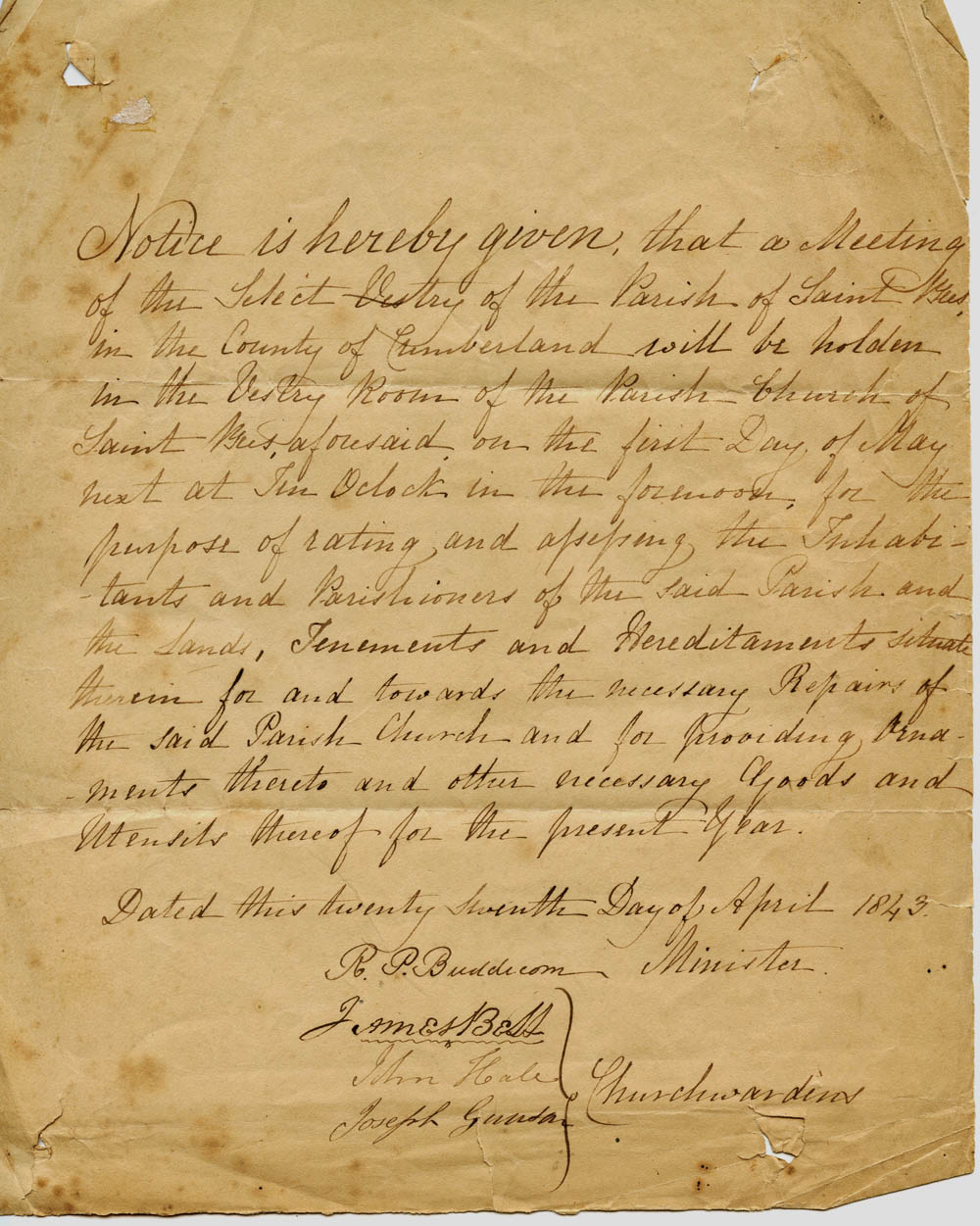
Notice dated April 1843 (which would have been pinned to the church door) calling a meeting of the select vestry of the parish of St Bees, for rating and assessing property in the parish to raise money for the repair of the church and the provision of ornaments and other necessary goods for the coming year. It is signed by the Rev R P Buddicom, vicar of St Bees, and three of the four churchwardens

The vestry was a meeting of the parish ratepayers chaired by the incumbent of the parish, originally held in the parish church or its vestry, from which it got its name. (Note: A vestry is a room in a church or synagogue in which the vestments are kept, and in which the clergy and choir don these liturgical clothes for worship services. Valuable or sacred items such as communion vessels or collection plates may be kept there, usually in a secure safe, along with official records such as registers of marriages and burials.) (Note: In Welsh chapels, the room is often the location of a tea served to the congregation, particularly family members, after a funeral, when the congregation returns to the chapel after the burial or cremation.)

The vestry committees were not rooted in any specific statute, but they evolved independently in each parish according to local needs from their roots in medieval parochial governance. By the late 17th century they had become, along with the county magistrates, the rulers of rural England.

In England, until the 19th century, the parish vestry committee equated to today's parochial church councils plus all local government responsible for secular local business, which is now the responsibility of a District Council as well as in some areas a Civil Parish Council, and other activities, such as administering locally the poor law.

Parish chest in St Mary's Church, Kempley, Gloucestershire

== Origins ==
The original unit of settlement among the Anglo-Saxons in England was the tun or town. The inhabitants met to conduct business in the town moot or meeting, at which they would assign tasks, and the common law would be promulgated. Later with the rise of the shire, the township would send its reeve and four best men to represent it in the courts of the hundred and shire. However, township independence in the Saxon system was lost to the feudal manorial court leet, which replaced the town meeting.

Assembly of parishes rested on land ownership, so increasingly the manorial system, with parishes assembled by lords of the manor in concert with local clergy and religious institutions. Initially, the manor was the principal unit of local administration, common customs and justice in the rural economy, but over time the church replaced the manorial court in key elements of rural life and improvement—it levied its local tax on produce, tithes. By the early Tudor period the division of manors and the new mercantile middle class had eroded the old feudal model, These changes accelerated with the Reformation in the 1530s, with the sequestration of religious houses and the greatest estates of the church, and under Mary I and others, a parish system developed to attend to social and economic needs. These changes transformed participation in the township or parish meeting, which dealt with civil and ecclesiastical demands, needs and projects. This new meeting was supervised by the parish priest (vicar/rector/curate), probably the best educated of the inhabitants, and became known as the vestry meeting.

== Growth of power ==
As the complexity of rural society increased, the vestry meetings acquired greater responsibilities and were given the power to grant or deny payments from parish funds. Although the vestry committees were not established by any law and had come into being in an unregulated process, it was convenient to allow them to develop. For example, they were the obvious body for administering the Edwardian and Elizabethan systems for support of the poor on a parochial basis. This was their principal, statutory power for many centuries.

With the gradual formalisation of civil responsibilities, the ecclesiastical parishes acquired a dual nature and could be classified as civil and ecclesiastical parishes. In England, until the 19th century, the parish vestry was in effect what would today usually be called a parochial church council. Still, it was also responsible for all the secular parish business now dealt with by civil bodies, such as parish councils.

Eventually, the vestry assumed a variety of tasks. It became responsible for appointing parish officials, such as the parish clerk, overseers of the poor, sextons and scavengers, constables, and nightwatchmen.

At the high point of their powers, just prior to removal of Poor Law responsibilities in 1834, the vestries spent not far short of one-fifth of the budget of the national government itself. More than 15,600 ecclesiastical parish vestries looked after their own: churches and burial grounds, parish cottages and workhouses, endowed charities, market crosses, pumps, pounds, whipping posts, stocks, cages, watch houses, weights and scales, clocks, and fire engines. Or to put it another way: the maintenance of the church and its services, the keeping of the peace, the repression of vagrancy, the relief of destitution, the mending of roads, the suppression of nuisances, the destruction of vermin, the furnishing of soldiers and sailors, and the enforcement of religious and moral discipline. These were among the many duties imposed on the parish and its officers, that is to say, the vestry and its organisation, by the law of the land, and by local custom and practice.

This level of activity resulted in an increasing sophistication of administration. The parish clerk would administer the decisions and accounts of the vestry committee, and records of parish business would be stored in a "parish chest" kept in the church and provided for security with three different locks, the individual keys to which would be held by such as the parish priest and churchwardens.

== Select vestry ==
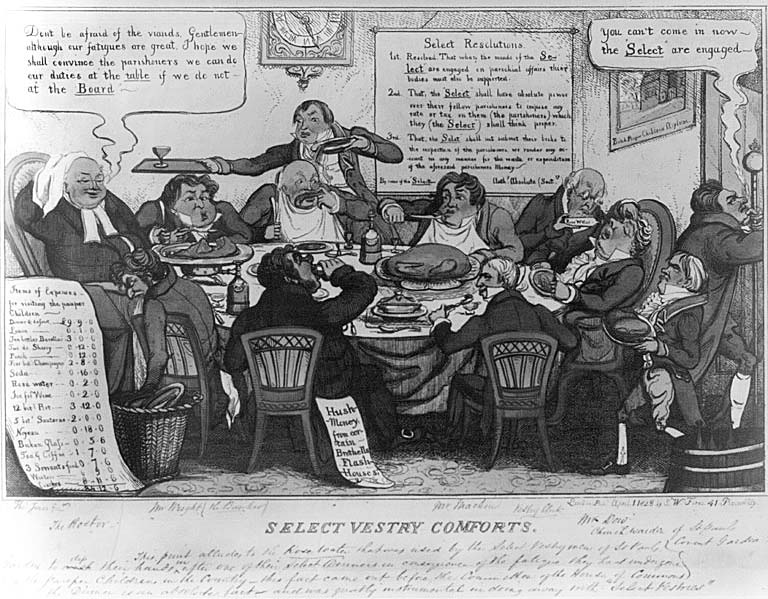
Satirical cartoon of the select vestry of St. Paul's, Covent Garden. Thomas Jones 1828

While the vestry was a general meeting of all inhabitant rate-paying householders in a parish, in the 17th century the huge growth of population in some parishes, mostly urban, made it increasingly difficult to convene and conduct meetings. Consequently, in some of these a new body, the select vestry, was created. This was an administrative committee of selected parishioners whose members generally had a property qualification and who were recruited largely by co-option. This took responsibility from the community at large and improved efficiency, but over time tended to lead to governance by a self-perpetuating elite. This committee was also known as the close vestry, whilst the term open vestry was used for the meeting of all ratepayers.

By the late 17th century, a number of autocratic and corrupt select vestries had become a national scandal, and several bills were introduced to parliament in the 1690s, but none became acts. There was continual agitation for reform, and in 1698 to keep the debate alive the House of Lords insisted that a bill to reform the select vestries, the Select Vestries Bill, would always be the first item of business of the Lords in a new parliament until a reform bill was passed. The First Reading of the bill was made annually, but it never got any further every year. This continues to this day as an archaic custom in the Lords to assert the independence from the Crown, even though the select vestries have long been abolished.

== Decline ==
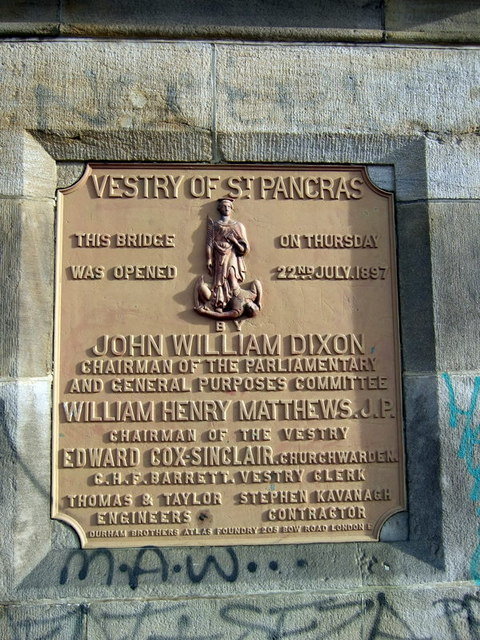
A plaque commemorating an 1897 bridge building initiative in London. George Bernard Shaw was elected to the St Pancras vestry in 1897. It became the Metropolitan Borough of St Pancras in 1900.

A major responsibility of the vestry had been the administration of the Poor Law. Still, the widespread unemployment following the Napoleonic Wars overwhelmed the vestries, and under the Poor Law Amendment Act 1834 this duty was transferred to elected boards of guardians for single parishes or to poor law unions for larger areas. These new bodies now received the poor law levy and administered the system. This legislation removed a large portion of the income of the vestry and a significant part of its duties.

The vestries escaped the Municipal Corporations Act 1835, which brought more democratic and open processes to municipal bodies. Still, there was a gradual movement to separate the vestry's ecclesiastical and secular duties. The Vestries Act 1850 prevented the holding of meetings in churches, and in London, vestries were incorporated under the Metropolis Management Act 1855 to create properly regulated civil bodies for London parishes. Still, they did not have any ecclesiastical duties.

As the 19th century progressed, the parish vestry progressively lost its secular duties to the increasing number of local boards which came into being and operated across greater areas than single parishes for a specific purpose. These were able to levy their rate. Among these were the local boards of health created under the Public Health Act 1848 (11 & 12 Vict. c. 63), the burial boards, which took over responsibility for secular burials in 1853, and the Sanitary districts, which were established in 1875. The church rate ceased to be levied in many parishes and was made voluntary in 1868.

However, the proliferation of these local bodies led to a confusing fragmentation of local government responsibilities, and this became a driver for large scale reform in local government, which resulted in the Local Government Act 1894. The problem of so many local bodies was expressed by H H Fowler, President of the Local Government Board, who said in the parliamentary debate for the 1894 Act....

62 counties, 302 Municipal Boroughs, 31 Improvement Act Districts, 688 Local Government Districts, 574 Rural Sanitary Districts, 58 Port Sanitary Districts, 2,302 School Board Districts ... 1,052 Burial Board Districts, 648 Poor Law Unions, 13,775 Ecclesiastical Parishes, and nearly 15,000 Civil Parishes. The total number of Authorities which tax the English ratepayers is between 28,000 and 29,000. Not only are we exposed to this multiplicity of authority and this confusion of rating power, but the qualification, tenure, and mode of election of members of these Authorities differ in different cases."

Under the Act, secular and ecclesiastical duties were finally separated when a system of elected rural parish councils and urban district councils was introduced. This removed all secular matters from the parish vestries, and created parish councils or parish meetings to manage these. The parish vestries were left with only church affairs to manage.

== Residual ecclesiastical use ==
Following the removal of civil powers in 1894, the vestry meetings continued to administer church matters in Church of England parishes until the Parochial Church Councils (Powers) Measure 1921 Act established parochial church councils as their successors. Since then, the only remnant of the vestry meeting has been the meeting of parishioners, which is convened annually solely for the election of churchwardens of the ecclesiastical parish. This is sometimes referred to as the "annual vestry meeting". Parochial church councils now undertake all other roles of the vestry meetings.

The term vestry continues to be used in some other denominations, denoting a body of lay members elected by the congregation to run the business of a church parish. This is the case in the Scottish, and the American Episcopal Churches, and in Anglican ecclesiastical provinces such as Australia, Canada and New Zealand. In the American Episcopal church, vestry members are generally elected annually and serve as the legal representatives of the church. Within the Church of Ireland the term "select vestry" is used to describe the members of the parish who are elected to conduct the affairs of the parish.

== Legislation ==
The Vestries Acts 1818 to 1853 is the collective title of the following Acts:

- The Vestries Act 1818 (58 Geo. 3. c. 69)
- The Vestries Act 1819 (59 Geo. 3. c. 85)
- The Vestries Act 1831 (1 & 2 Will. 4. c. 60)
- The Parish Notices Act 1837 (7 Will. 4 & 1 Vict. c. 45)
- The Vestries Act 1850 (13 & 14 Vict. c. 57)
- The Vestries Act 1853 (16 & 17 Vict. c. 65)

== See also ==
- Civil parish
- Sacristy
