= Aston Cantlow Parochial Church Council v Wallbank =

2003 House of Lords case concerning chancel repair liability

- Court: House of Lords
- Citations: [2003] UKHL 37, [2003] 3 WLR 283

Keywords
- Judicial review

Aston Cantlow Parochial Church Council v Wallbank [2003] UKHL 37 is a UK constitutional law case, concerning judicial review.

== Facts ==
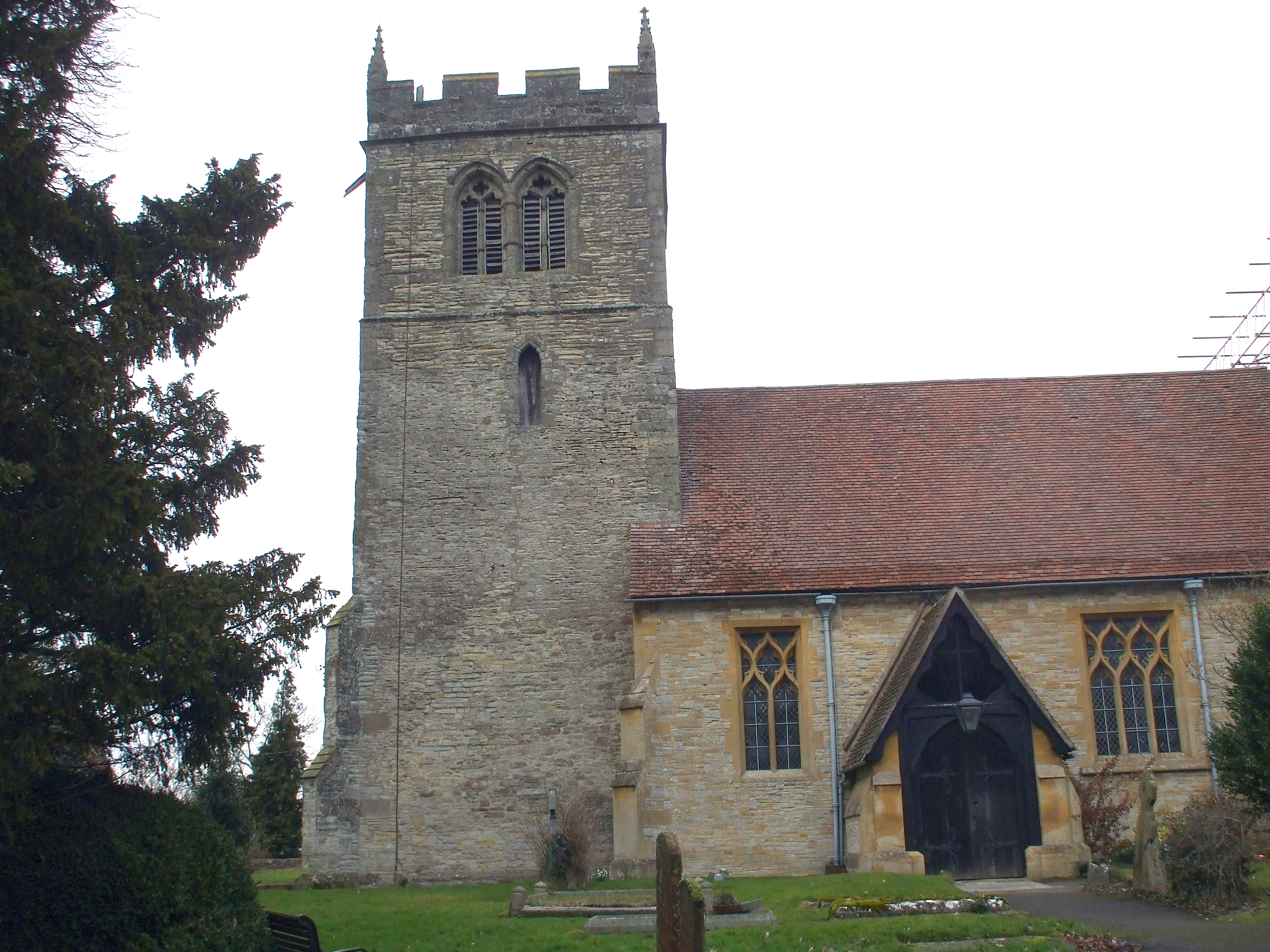
Medieval-built church where this liability applied in Aston Cantlow. Its historic rectorship was acquired by a monastery, abbey or college of Oxford or Cambridge leaving a discharged vicarage

In the vast majority of ecclesiastical parishes (into which all of England and Wales is split) chancel repair liability is not applicable. However, in 2003, in a particularly lightly populated glebe, Andrew and Gail Wallbank received a demand for almost £100,000 to fund repairs of their parish's medieval church at Aston Cantlow in Warwickshire. Mr. and Mrs. Wallbank and other ‘lay rectors’ claimed they were not liable to pay costs to repair their parish church, and that this would be a violation of their right to property enshrined in the European Convention on Human Rights (ECHR), Protocol 1, Article 1. The public authority was a parochial church council of the Church of England. After a protracted legal battle, the Law Lords found in favour of the parochial church council, leaving the Wallbanks with a £350,000 bill including legal costs.

== Judgment ==
The House of Lords held the Aston Cantlow parochial church council was not a core public authority under the ECHR and its case law on religious bodies. The parochial church council was not a hybrid public authority either, but the issue had to be dealt with on a case-by-case basis. The council was seeking to enforce a duty to pay for church repairs, and this was effectively a ‘civil debt’, and so a private, not a public obligation.

Lord Nicholls said this:

7. Conformably with this purpose, the phrase 'a public authority' in section 6(1) is essentially a reference to a body whose nature is governmental in a broad sense of that expression. It is in respect of organisations of this nature that the government is answerable under the European Convention on Human Rights. Hence, under the Human Rights Act a body of this nature is required to act compatibly with Convention rights in everything it does. The most obvious examples are government departments, local authorities, the police and the armed forces. Behind the instinctive classification of these organisations as bodies whose nature is governmental lie factors such as the possession of special powers, democratic accountability, public funding in whole or in part, an obligation to act only in the public interest, and a statutory constitution: see the valuable article by Professor Dawn Oliver, 'The Frontiers of the State: Public Authorities and Public Functions under the Human Rights Act', [2000] PL 476.

Lord Hope said this:

... as Professor Oliver has pointed out in her commentary on the decision of the Court of Appeal in this case, "Chancel repairs and the Human Rights Act" [2001] PL 651, the decided cases on the amenability of bodies to judicial review have been made for purposes which have nothing to do with the liability of the state in international law. They cannot be regarded as determinative of a body's membership of the class of "core" public authorities: see also Grosz, Beatson, Duffy, Human Rights: The 1998 Act and the European Convention (2000), p 61, para 4-04. Nor can they be regarded as determinative of the question whether a body falls within the "hybrid" class. That is not to say that the case law on judicial review may not provide some assistance as to what does, and what does not, constitute a "function of a public nature" within the meaning of section 6(3)(b). It may well be helpful. But the domestic case law must be examined in the light of the jurisprudence of the Strasbourg Court as to those bodies which engage the responsibility of the State for the purposes of the Convention.
