= Glossary of law =

This page is a glossary of law.

== A ==
- A fortiori. By a stronger reason. A term used in logic to denote an argument to the effect that because one ascertained fact exists, therefore another, which is included in it, and which is less improbable, unusual, or surprising, must also exist.
- A mensa et thoro. From bed and board. Descriptive of a limited divorce or separation by judicial sentence.
- A quo: from which. The Court a quo is the court from which a cause has been removed to a higher court, which latter is called the Court ad quem.
- A vinculo matrimonii. (Lat. from the bond of matrimony) A term descriptive of a kind of divorce, which effects a complete dissolution of the marriage contract.
- Abactor. l. A cattle-stealer.
- Abandonment. Desertion; surrender; relinquishment of property; as when an insured person makes over his rights in the goods to the insurer.
- Abarnare. l. To detect or disclose a crime.
- Accessary. In criminal law. Contributing to or aiding in the commission of a crime. One who, without being present at the commission of a felonious offence, becomes guilty of such offence, not as a chief actor, but as a participator, as by command, advice, instigation or concealment; either before or after the fact or commission; a particeps criminis.
- Account. A detailed statement of the mutual demands in the nature of debt and credit between parties, arising out of contracts or some fiduciary relation.
- Act of God. Under the term "act of God" are comprehended all misfortunes and accidents arising from inevitable necessity, which human prudence could not foresee or prevent.
- Ad valorem. According to value. Duties are either ad valorem or specific; the former when the duty is laid in the form of a percentage on the value of the property; the latter when it is imposed as a fixed sum on each article of a class without regard to its value.
- Arbitrio boni viri. By or according to the decision or the award of an honest, conscientious man. v. Lex non exacte, etc.

== B ==
- Bail. In practice. The sureties who procure the release of a person under arrest, by becoming responsible for his appearance at the time and place designated. Those persons who become sureties for the appearance of the defendant in court.
- Bailee. In the law of contracts. One to whom goods are bailed; the party to whom personal property is delivered under a contract of bailment.
- Bailor. The party who bails or delivers goods to another, in the contract of bailment.
- Bastardy. The offence of begetting a bastard child. The condition of a bastard.
- Benefice. In ecclesiastical law. In its technical sense, this term includes ecclesiastical preferments to which rank or public office is attached, otherwise described as ecclesiastical dignities or offices, such as bishoprics, deaneries, and the like, but in popular acceptation, it is almost invariably appropriated to rectories, vicarages, perpetual curacies, district churches, and endowed chapelries.
- Best evidence. Primary evidence, as distinguished from secondary; original, as distinguished from substitutionary; the best and highest evidence of which the nature of the case is susceptible. A written instrument is itself always regarded as the primary or best possible evidence of its existence and contents; a copy, or the recollection of a witness, would be secondary evidence.
- Bill of credit. In constitutional law. A bill or promissory note issued by the government of a state or nation, upon its faith and credit, designed to circulate in the community as money, and redeemable at a future day.

== C ==
- Canon. A law, rule, or ordinance in general, and of the church in particular. An ecclesiastical law or statute.

== D ==
- Damage feasant or faisant. Doing damage. A term applied to a person's cattle or beasts found upon another's land, doing damage by treading down the grass, grain, etc.
- Dual representation. A concept where one lawyer represents two people who may have conflicting interests. It may occur in immigration law, family law, or real estate law, for example.

== E ==
- Ejectment. At common law, this was the name of a mixed action (springing from the earlier personal action of ejectione firmae) which lay for the recovery of the possession of land, and for damages for the unlawful detention of its possession. The action was highly fictitious, being in theory only for the recovery of a term for years, and brought by a purely fictitious person, as lessee in a supposed lease from the real party in interest. The latter's title, however, must be established in order to warrant a recovery, and the establishment of such title, though nominally a mere incident, is in reality the object of the action. Hence this convenient form of suit came to be adopted as the usual method of trying titles to land.

== F ==
- Fabricated evidence. Evidence manufactured or arranged after the fact, and either wholly false or else warped and discoloured by artifice and contrivance with a deceitful intent.

== G ==
- General occupant. At common law where a man was tenant pur autre vie, or had an estate granted to himself only (without mentioning his heirs) for the life of another man, and died without alienation during the life of cestui que vie, or him by whose life it was holden, he that could first enter on the land might lawfully retain the possession, so long as cestui que vie lived, by right of occupancy, and was hence termed a "general" or "common occupant".

== H ==
- Hearsay. A term applied to that species of testimony given by a witness who relates, not what he knows personally, but what others have told him, or what he has heard said by others.

== I ==
- Identity. In the law of evidence. Sameness; the fact that a subject, person, or thing before a court is the same as it is represented, claimed, or charged to be.
- Immediately. Courts have used immediately to mean "Promptly, with expedition, with reasonable haste consistent with fair business activity." 46 Am J1st Sales § 163.

As used in a request made to a carrier for freight cars: -- at once. 13 Am J2d Car § 153.
As an adverb of time in the clause of an accident policy providing for certain indemnity in case of injury causing total disability "immediately": -- proximity of time with the injury, as presently, or without any substantial interval between the accident and the disability. 29A Am J Rev ed Ins § 1526.
As a limitation of time for the commencement of an action: -- within a reasonable time and without unnecessary delay.

Putnam v Putnam, 86 Mont 135, 282 P 855.
Courts, looking at the substance of contracts and statutes, have, during the last two centuries, repeatedly declared that the word "immediately," although in strictness it excludes all meantimes, yet to make good the deeds and intents of the parties, it shall be construed "such convenient time as is reasonably requisite for doing the thing." Anno: 16 ALR 609.

- Immediate injury. An injury resulting directly from an act rather than an injury ensuing the act. (e.g. Mulchanock v. Whitehall Cement Manufacturing Co., 253 Pa. 262, 98 A. 554 (1916).)
- Immediately adjacent. Adjoining or abutting, rather than in the vicinity. (e.g. Parsons v. Wethersfield, 135 Conn. 24, 60 A.2d 771, 4 A.L.R.2d 330 (1948) — term in a statutory provision requiring a unanimous vote of the commission on a question of rezoning property over the protest of 20 per cent of the owners of lots "immediately adjacent".)
- Immediately due at the option of the holder. Immediately due upon or after the holder's election to exercise the option. (e.g. Damet v. Aetna Life Ins. Co., 71 Okla. 122, 179 P. 760, 5 A.L.R. 434.)
- Immediately on demand. Payment after a reasonable opportunity for complying with the demand. (e.g. 40 Am. Jur. Paym § 15.)
- Immediately upon arrival. Phrase appearing in directions to a factor to sell goods; as soon after arrival as a sale can be made, irrespective of loss, the factor being precluded from exercising his discretion. (e.g. Courcier v. Ritter, 6 F. Cas. No. 3,282.)
- In casu. In this case.

== J ==
- Joinder. Joining or coupling together; uniting two or more constituents or elements in one; uniting with another person in some legal step or proceeding.

== K ==
- Keelage. The right of exacting a toll from ships in a harbor; the money so paid.

== L ==
- Lease. A conveyance of land or tenements to a person for life, for a term of years, or at will, in consideration of a return of rent or some other recompense. The person who so conveys such lands or tenements is termed the "lessor", and the person to whom they are conveyed, the "lessee"; and when the lessor so conveys lands or tenements to a lessee; he is said to lease, demise, or let them.

== M ==
- Mala in se. Wrongs in themselves; acts morally wrong; offences against conscience.

== N ==
- Negative. A denial; a proposition by which something is denied; a statement in the form of denial. Two negatives do not make a good issue.

== O ==
- Obligee. The person in favor of whom some obligation is contracted, whether such obligation be to pay money or to do or not to do something. The party to whom a bond is given.

== P ==
- Parcel. In the law of real property, parcel signifies a part or portion of land. As used of chattels, it signifies a small package or bundle.

== Q ==
- Quare. Lat. Wherefore; for what reason; on what account. Used in the form of several common law writs.

== R ==
- Ratification. The confirmation of a previous act done either by the party himself or by another; confirmation of a voidable act.

== S ==
- Servient. Serving; subject to a service or servitude. A servient estate is one which is burdened with a servitude.
- Sound. To have an essential quality, —as, applied to an action, to sound in damages. Therefore "to sound in damages" is "to have the essential quality of damages". Hence the expressions to sound and sounds in.
- Sound in damages. An action is technically said to sound in damages when it is brought, not for the specific recovery of lands, goods, or sums of money (as is the case in real and mixed actions, or in the personal actions of debt and detinue), but for recovery of damages only, as in actions of covenant, trespass, etc. Steph. Pl. 116.

== T ==
- Testator. One who makes or has made a testament or will; one who dies leaving a will.

== U ==
- Underwriter. The person who insures another in a fire or life policy; the insurer. A person who joins with another in entering into a marine policy of insurance as insurer.

== V ==
- Valid. Of binding force. A deed, will, or other instrument, which has received all the formalities required by law, is said to be valid.

== W ==
- Words of limitation. In a conveyance or will, words which have the effect of marking the duration of an estate are termed "words of limitation". Thus, in a grant to A and his heirs, the words "and his heirs” are words of limitation, because they show that A is to take an estate in fee-simple, and do not give his heirs anything.

== X ==
- Xenodochium. gr.-l. In the civil and old English law. An inn licensed for the entertainment of strangers; a place where sick and infirm persons were cared for; a hospital.

== Y ==
- Yalemaines. fr. At least, however.

== Z ==
- Zelde. o. sc. A gift or donation.

== See also ==
- Glossary of land law
- Glossary of patent law terms
