= Parochial church council =

Executive body for a Church of England parish

A parochial church council (PCC) is the executive committee of a Church of England parish and consists of clergy and churchwardens of the parish, together with representatives of the laity. It has its origins in the vestry committee, which looked after both religious and secular matters in a parish. It is a corporate charitable body.

Legally the council is responsible for the financial affairs of the church parish and the maintenance of its assets, such as churches and church halls. It also assists the clergy in the management of church affairs in the parish, and promoting the mission of the church.

== History ==
Until 1894, the vestry committee managed both the secular and religious business in a parish. The Local Government Act 1894 took away its secular duties and gave them to the newly created civil parish councils. Church business continued to be managed by the vestry committee until 1921, when PCCs were created after the "Rules for the Representation of the Laity" was adopted in 1919 by the Convocations of Canterbury and York. Most of the remaining functions of vestry meetings of parishes, and of the churchwardens of parishes, which had not been transferred to civil local authorities were transferred to PCCs by the Parochial Church Councils (Powers) Measure 1921 (11 & 12 Geo. 5 No. 1). (Measures passed by the Church Assembly, now replaced by the General Synod of the Church of England, are given the force of law by act of Parliament, the Church of England Assembly (Powers) Act 1919.)

PCCs are constituted under the Church Representation Rules (Schedule 3 to the Synodical Government Measure 1969).

== Powers and duties ==
The powers and duties of PCCs are laid down by the Parochial Church Councils (Powers) Measure 1956. They include the duty to co-operate with the minister (rector, vicar or priest in charge) "in promoting in the parish the whole mission of the Church, pastoral, evangelistic, social and ecumenical."

The PCC is responsible for the financial affairs of the church, and the care and maintenance of the church fabric and its contents, including demanding chancel repair liability, if applicable, from local property owners. These responsibilities are executed by churchwardens, paid staff or other volunteers. The PCC also has a voice in the forms of service used by the church and may make representations to the bishop and deanery synod on matters affecting the welfare and pastoral care of the parish.

The PCC is required to appoint a church electoral roll officer who maintains the church electoral roll of lay members entitled to take part in the annual parochial church meeting. A new roll must be prepared every 6 years, and revised annually.

== Membership ==
The constitution of a PCC is prescribed by the Church Representation Rules, Part 9.

A PCC consists of (i) the clergy of the parish, (ii) certain lay people licensed to the parish, (iii) the churchwardens of the parish, (iv) members of the General Synod, diocesan synod or deanery synod who are on the roll of the parish, and (v) representatives of the laity elected at the annual parochial church meeting. To be qualified for election as a representative of the laity, a person must be of the laity, an actual communicant, aged 16 or over, and not disqualified (e.g. by conviction of certain offences, disqualification as a company director or entry on a "barred list"), and must be on the church electoral roll (and, unless under 18, have been on the roll for at least 6 months); he or she must be nominated and seconded by persons on the roll, and be willing to serve.

Churchwardens are elected at an annual Meeting of Parishioners pursuant to the Churchwardens Measure 2001. Churchwardens are ex-officio members of the PCC and its standing committee. Other parish post-holders, such as the secretary, treasurer and sidesmen, are appointed by the PCC.

== Charitable status ==
Many PCCs are registered charities. "The advancement of religion" is a charitable purpose under the Charities Act 2011. The Charity Commission considers the legal duty of a PCC – to promote "the whole mission of the Church, pastoral, evangelistic, social and ecumenical" – to be charitable, so all PCCs have charitable purposes, regardless of whether they are registered with the Charity Commission. Members of a PCC are trustees of the charity. PCCs with income of more than £100,000 must register with the Charity Commission; those with lower incomes are "excepted charities" which means that they do not have to register or submit annual returns, but otherwise are regulated just like registered charities.

== See also ==
- Structure of the Church of England
- Meeting of parishioners
- Parish church
