= Deforce =

Unlawfully withholding land

Deforce is a legal term, meaning to unlawfully withhold land from its true owner or from any other person who has a right to the possession of it, after one has lawfully entered and taken possession of it.

Likewise, deforcement is a broad term for the holding of real property to which another person has a right; used especially to denote keeping out of possession one who has never had possession. It is an abatement, an intrusion, a dissension, a discontinuance, or any other kind of wrong by which a person who has a right to the freehold is kept out of possession.

== See also ==
- Land law
