= Meeting of parishioners =

The annual meeting of parishioners (also referred to as the annual vestry meeting) is held yearly in every parish of the Church of England to elect churchwardens and deputies (if any) for the forthcoming year. The meeting must be held by 31 May and is commonly held immediately prior to the annual meeting of the parochial church council. It is the last remnant of the old vestry meeting.

== The meeting ==
Since this is a public meeting, notice must be given in writing with the minimum period of two Sundays before the date of the meeting and the notice must be displayed publicly.

The meeting is convened and chaired by the minister (usually the incumbent or priest-in-charge), or if there is no minister or if she or he is unable or unwilling to chair the meeting, the churchwardens convene, and the meeting elects a chairman.

== Agenda ==
Typically, the meeting's structure is as follows:

- Opening statement by the chair, usually the parish priest
- Minutes of the previous annual vestry meeting
- Nominations for churchwardens have to have been handed to the minister before the meeting, in writing: he/she has the right to reject one of the nominees if he/she feels that person would be a difficulty
- Vote – only required if there are more applicants than posts available
- Meeting closes

As the agenda is so short, meetings typically last less than ten minutes.

== Attendees and voters ==
The following people may vote:

- People whose names are on the church electoral roll (whether or not they are resident in the church parish).
- People who are resident in the parish and who are also on the register of local government electors: in other words, any resident of the parish – of any faith or none – who is registered to vote.

== See also ==
- Parochial church council – an executive body all Church of England parishes have
- Vestry – the parish vestry meeting
