= Chancel Repairs Act 1932 =

Act of the Parliament of the United Kingdom

Chancel Repairs Act 1932 (Note: Section 5(1).)
- Act of Parliament
- Parliament of the United Kingdom
- Long title: An act to abolish proceedings in ecclesiastical courts for enforcing liability to repair certain chancels and to substitute other proceedings in lieu thereof, and otherwise to amend the law relating to such liability.
- Citation: 22 & 23 Geo. 5. c. 20
- Territorial extent: England (Note: Section 5(2).)

Dates
- Royal assent: 25 April 1932
- Commencement: 1 January 1933 (Note: Section 5(3).)
Other legislation
Amended by	Tithe Act 1936; Statute Law Revision Act 1950; Crime and Courts Act 2013

Status: Amended

Text of statute as originally enacted

Revised text of statute as amended

Text of the Chancel Repairs Act 1932 as in force today (including any amendments) within the United Kingdom, from legislation.gov.uk.

The Chancel Repairs Act 1932 (22 & 23 Geo. 5. c. 20) is an act of the Parliament of the United Kingdom that reasserts and imposes a chancel repair liability on the owners of certain real property.

Following the imposition of a prison sentence for contempt of ecclesiastical court in Hauxton PCC v Stevens, resulting from non-payment of chancel repair liability, the act moved jurisdiction from the ecclesiastical courts to the county courts, and made chancel repair liability a civil debt.

The law was upheld in the case of Aston Cantlow PCC v. Wallbank [2003] UKHL 37. The House of Lords re-asserted that the liability, thought by many to be anachronistic, persisted in English law. It had been declared by the Court of Appeal to be contrary to Article 1 of the First Protocol of the European Convention on Human Rights.

Though repeal has been recommended both by the Law Commission in its 1985 report and General Synod of the Church of England, only limited reform will be brought in during 2013 under the Land Registration Act 2002 as amended by the Land Registration Act 2002 (Transitional Provisions) (No. 2) Order 2003 (SI 2003/2431).
