= Churchwarden =

Lay officer of a parish or district church

A churchwarden is a lay official in a parish or congregation of the Anglican Communion, Lutheran Churches or Catholic Church, usually working as a part-time volunteer. In the Anglican tradition, holders of these positions are ex officio members of the parish board, usually called a vestry, parochial church council, or in the case of a Cathedral parish the chapter. Historically, a churchwarden was responsible for maintaining the churchwardens' accounts of the parish's income and expenses.

== Responsibilities of office ==
Churchwardens have a duty to represent the laity and co-operate with the incumbent (or, in cases of vacancy, the bishop). They are expected to lead the parishioners by setting a good example and encouraging unity and peace. They have a duty to maintain order and peace in the church and churchyard at all times, and especially during services, although this task tends to be devolved to sidesmen.

Churchwardens in many parts of the Anglican Communion are legally responsible for all the property and movable goods belonging to a parish church. If so, they have a duty under ecclesiastical law to keep an up-to-date inventory of the valuables, and if applicable a "terrier of the property" (a listing and/or map of the church's lands, known as glebe, some of which may be let). Whenever churchwardens authorise work on the church building having obtained a faculty or to carry out work recommended in the church's Quinquennial Inspection Report, they must record this in the Church Logbook; it is inspected with the inventory. The churchwardens must ensure these logs are ready for inspection in case of a visitation and for periodic inspections. Churchwardens were also historically responsible for churchwardens' accounts, which detailed the expenses and income of parishes.

Priests and their equivalent tend to devolve day-to-day maintenance of church buildings and contents to their churchwardens.

If an incumbency is vacant, the bishop (or the Archdeacon acting on his behalf) will usually appoint the churchwardens as sequestrators of the parish until the bishop appoints a new incumbent. The sequestrators ensure that a minimum number of church services continue to be held in the parish, and in particular that the Eucharist continues to be celebrated every Sunday and on every Principal Feast. This duty is usually discharged by organising a regular rota of a few volunteer clergy from amongst either Non-Stipendiary Ministers from within that diocese or in some cases retired clergy living in or near the parish. The bishop will tend to consult the churchwardens before appointing a new priest to take over the parish; in England there is a set process to follow which also involves representatives of the congregation.

Churchwardens' duties may vary with the customs of the parish or congregation, the canons of the diocese to which the parish belongs, the desires of the priest, and the direction of the parish board or the congregation as a whole. A definition of their duties is that they are "ultimately responsible for almost everything in a church which does not have to be done by a priest. If the churchwarden does not do it himself, then he is responsible for making sure that it is done by someone".

=== Powers ===
In England, churchwardens have specific powers of arrest to enable them to keep the peace in churchyards.

The following are punishable with a £200 fine:

- riotous, violent, or indecent behaviour in any cathedral church, parish or district church or chapel of the Church of England or in any churchyard or burial ground (whether during a service or at any other time)
- molesting, disturbing, vexing, or troubling, or by any other unlawful means disquieting or misusing:
  - any preacher duly authorised to preach therein, or
  - any clergyman in holy orders ministering or celebrating any sacrament, or any divine service, rite, or office, in any cathedral, church, or chapel, or in any churchyard or burial ground.

The churchwarden of the parish or place where the offence was committed may apprehend a person committing such an offence, and take them before a magistrates' court. In practice this means they should be aware of these offences and may be expected to conduct a citizen's arrest until police arrive, if appropriate. Until 2003, the offence was punishable by up to two months' imprisonment. However, caution is advised in the use of this power.

== Types of churchwarden ==
Historically, there are two main types of warden: the people's warden(s) (and assistants, if any) are elected annually by the congregation as a whole (at what is called the Annual Vestry Meeting or "meeting of the parishioners"); the rector's warden(s) (and assistants, if any), are appointed by the incumbent. However, this distinction has been abolished in several areas of the Anglican Communion in favour of both wardens being appointed jointly (notably in England, although the incumbent retains the right in some circumstances to appoint one warden).

In some jurisdictions (but not in England) where a parish temporarily has no priest, is not self-supporting, or in which the parish board has been dissolved, wardens are appointed directly by the bishop and are called "bishop's wardens".

The only areas in which wardens almost always have no authority, often proscribed by canon, are music and liturgy, which are considered to be under the exclusive authority of the priest or bishop in charge of the parish. Nevertheless, in England churchwardens have authority to officiate at Morning and Evening Prayer if a priest or licensed lay person is unavailable.

== Churchwardens by country ==
=== Church of England ===
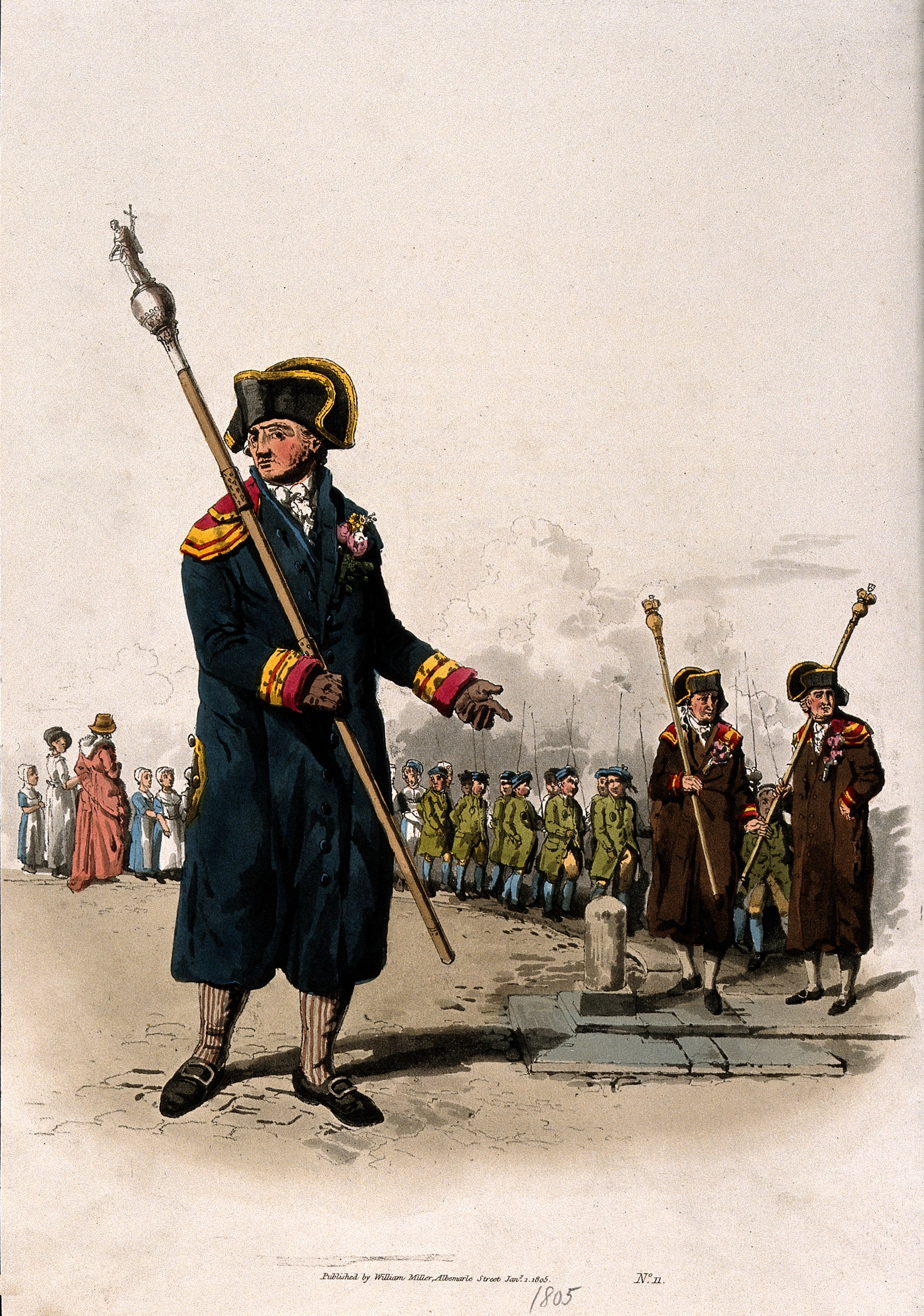
A beadle, carrying his staff; behind him two churchwardens

In the Church of England, churchwardens are officers of the parish and officers of the bishop. Each parish elects two churchwardens annually (unless an existing custom in place on 1 January 2002, and which has continued since before 1 January 1925, states otherwise) and they are elected on or before 31 May and are sworn in between being elected and 31 August the same year. Churchwardens are (re-)elected annually at the Meeting of Parishioners and can serve a maximum of six years followed by a two-year break unless the rule is previously suspended by the Meeting of Parishioners.

A few Anglican churches, for historical reasons outlined above, have three churchwardens instead of the usual two; two such examples are All Saints, West Ham and St Margaret's, Barking. Historically, there are also a few churches which retain four churchwardens with St. Mary's, Ecclesfield, Sheffield, as an example.

Some churches may appoint Assistant Churchwardens to help them. These are distinct from Deputy Churchwardens who have a precise role in certain limited cases. The terms "Honorary Churchwarden" or "Churchwarden Emeritus" are sometimes bestowed on retiring churchwardens; these are purely honorary terms and do not allow such a holder to continue to sit unelected on the PCC.

=== Church of Ireland ===
One Church Warden is appointed by the incumbent, whilst another is elected by the Easter General Vestry. Both serve for one year terms, during which they are ex officio members of the select vestry. As well as performing some logistical functions normally associated with a sexton or verger, church wardens have certain constitutional rights and responsibilities: they may convene and chair meetings of the General Vestry or Select Vestry (but only under certain circumstances), and their consent is required for the use of any experimental forms of service and for any visiting ministers who are not in full communion with the Church of Ireland. Church Wardens are also responsible for overseeing the collection during the Offertory, for the presentation of the bread and wine to the officiating priest during Holy Communion, and for the safe custody of church plate.

=== Episcopal Church in the USA ===
The canons of some US dioceses permit or mandate the election of all wardens, in which case they are usually referred to as the "senior warden" and the "junior warden". Sometimes, however, the senior warden is known as the "rector's warden" and the junior warden, the "people's warden". In some of the latter cases, the rector's warden is chosen by the rector, while the people's warden is elected by the congregation. Wardens serve for a fixed term, normally one to two years, and are usually automatically members of the parish canonical committee, commonly called the "vestry", and sometimes automatically delegates to the diocesan synod, or convention, as well.

=== Anglican Church of Southern Africa ===
The duties of churchwardens in the Anglican Church of Southern Africa (ACSA) are detailed in Canon 29 of the Canons and Constitution of the ACSA, as follows.

Churchwardens are the officers of the Bishop and the principal representatives of the congregations. Together with the Incumbent they constitute the executive of the Parish Council and have special responsibility in the following matters:

- to ensure that a register is kept of all parishioners;
- to keep an inventory of all goods, ornaments and furniture belonging to the church, to provide for the safety and preservation of the registers and to deliver the same to their successors on ceasing to hold office;
- to execute the policy of the Parish Council relating to property and parochial finance;
- to be responsible for the preparation of annual estimates of revenue and expenditure and the presentation of accounts to the Vestry;
- to see to the seating of the congregation, without respect of persons;
- to aid the Incumbent with information and counsel in all matters relating to the Parish, and particularly in cases contemplated in the rubrics before the service of Holy Communion.
- to complain to the Bishop or Archdeacon if there should be anything plainly amiss or reprehensible in the life or doctrine of the Incumbent and also if there be anything contrary to order or decorum in the administration of Divine Service.

Additional duties and responsibilities may also be specified in the various dioceses of the Province.

== See also ==
- Sexton (office)
- Sidesman
- Steward (Methodism)
- Verger

== General and cited references ==
- "Canon E1 Of Churchwardens". Church of England.
- "Ecclesiastical Courts Jurisdiction Act 1860". legislation.gov.uk. 1860.
- "Churchwardens Measure 2001". Office for Public Sector Information. 2001.
- Clements, Matthew (2018). Rotas, Rules and Rectors: How to Thrive being a Churchwarden. London: Matador. ISBN 978-1-78901-631-4.
- "Canon C29: Of Churchwardens and Chapel Wardens". Anglican Church of Southern Africa. Archived from the original on 2014-10-30.
