= Glossary of land law =

A glossary of land law contains mostly middle English concepts, which are often found in older judgments, and refer to obsolete rights or remedies.

== Glossary ==
Borough English

Copyhold
n. an interest, or tenure, in land where the holder's title deeds were copy of the entries kept by the lord of the manor. It was incrementally abolished from 1841 to 1925.

Deforce
v. to unlawfully withhold land from its true owner or from any other person who has a right to the possession of it.

Ejectment
n. a claim by a land owner to eject a person from the land. The modern term is "eviction".

Feoffee
n. a person who holds land for the benefit of another person. It derives from the old word "fief", which is a right to land (as in fiefdom, dominion over land) and relates now to the modern concept of a "fee simple", immediate and indefinite ownership of land.

Gavelkind

Mortgage
n. a right arising from a contract to take the title deeds for a specific asset (usually a house) and give them back when debts are repaid. Typically a bank lends money to a home owner, and if the home owner breaks their repayment agreements, the bank "forecloses" as seeks an order to take possession and sell off the house. In French "mort" means "dead" and "gage" means "pledge", and is so called because the mortgage terminates once the contract is fulfilled. This is one kind of four security interests, along with a pledge, a possessory lien, and an equitable charge.

Perpetuity
n. a stream of income that will continue forever. The common law rule against perpetuities in the Duke of Norfolk's case had the purpose of preventing assets being tied up indefinitely, by granting gifts to far off descendants. It said that a gift must become unconditional 21 years after the death of its maker.

Primogeniture
n. a right by law for the first-born child, usually a son, to inherit the whole estate of the parents, to the exclusion of other siblings.

Puisne mortgage
n. an "inferior" mortgage, that is created on a property after another mortgage (ie the second or third one). This has to be registered as a "class C" interest under LCA 1972 s 2(4)(i) in unregistered land, and is thus the only legal interest that may fail to bind a third party if not registered.

Quia Emptores
a 1290 statute that prevented landowners "sub-letting" or "subinfeudinating" their property. They had to sell it, and the buyer had to assume all the taxes and feudal obligations of the seller. The Latin means literally "because of the buyers".

Seisin
n. legal possession of a feudal estate. To be "seised" of an estate means having possession of it. The "Assize of novel disseisin" was a tribunal to recover estates that had been taken by someone else (who had "disseised" the claimant) and a "livery of seisin" would be a symbolic ceremony to deliver ownership of land from one person to another.

Tenure
n. a right to stay on land. Someone with a tenure to stay for a certain number or term of years is typically called a "tenant".

== See also ==
- English land law
- English property law
- Glossary of law
