= Sidesperson =

Anglican church usher

A sidesperson, also known as a sidesman, usher, or assistant churchwarden, in Anglican churches is responsible for greeting members of the congregation, overseeing seating arrangements in church, making the congregation queue for communion at the altar in an orderly way, and for taking the collection. In England they are usually appointed by the parochial church council and receive guidance in their duties from the churchwardens.

In the Anglican Church of Southern Africa "Sidesmen may be appointed in any Parish to perform such duties as the Parish Council shall determine."
