= Chancel repair liability =

Legal obligation of property owners in England and Wales

Chancel repair liability is a legal obligation on a small number of property owners in England and Wales to pay for certain repairs to a church, often the local parish church.

Where people purchase property within land that was once rectorial (part of a rectory or glebe), they may acquire a responsibility to fund repairs to the chancel of the medieval-founded Church of England parish church or Church in Wales church which that glebe land supported. This can still be invoked by the church council of some parishes.

It is common practice for purchasers of land to check whether the local parish includes a church where such a liability may apply, and if so to take out chancel liability insurance.

== History ==
From pre-Reformation times, churches in England and Wales have been ministered by either a vicar, who received a stipend (salary), or a rector or parson who received tithes from the parish. The rectors (of around 5,200 churches) were responsible for the repairs of the chancel of their church, while the parish members were responsible for the rest of the building. Monasteries and Oxford and Cambridge colleges could buy or receive rectorships, and thus become liable for chancel repairs. When Henry VIII dissolved the monasteries and sold their rectory (with land), or the relevant university college sold this, the chancel repair liability passed with that land and persists today, even after subdivision. The owners of such land are thus equally called lay impropriators or lay rectors.

As far as spiritual rectors are concerned, their liability transferred to parochial church councils by the Ecclesiastical Dilapidations Measure 1923.

The recovery of funds from lay rectors is governed by the Chancel Repairs Act 1932.

In concept, to be a lay rector is now entirely a burden for having taken rights over land such as impropriated glebe (the vast majority of glebe formerly held by a vicar or clerical rector has no liability) or abbey lands, and therefore being exempt from paying the tithes that other parts of that parish paid, as the agricultural produce or (after 1836) rentcharges the landowner used to receive no longer apply. Lay rectors would usually be wealthy landowners owning a substantial amount of property in the parish. Tithes have been terminated or commuted for centuries and en masse since the Tithe Commutation Act 1836, the remaining ones terminating under the Finance Act 1977, so it is sometimes possible (Note: Sources such as A Topographical Dictionary of England by Samuel Lewis, and the Victoria County Histories, in most areas state whether there was, an acquisition of the rectory, however who owned merged land (if any) at final apportionment in the 20th century, or rentcharge-accruing land is not accessible in such sources.) to discover definitively from any free source whether a given piece of land is still glebe in a present parish that must have had a rector but no longer does; maps and records held by the National Archives can be consulted. Also, in some cases it is possible to see which plots of land fall under headings c) and d) of apportionment of chancel liability, from the church website itself. If a parish's liability only falls under headings a) or b) then those persons (a corporate/charitable body or private individual) are liable only; however, some geographically diverse parishes had extraneous tithings and in a few cases in the 19th century a merger of the rectory/rectorial land and tithes into one piece of land as a whole took place, such as in Aston Cantlow, Warwickshire.

The liability can be compounded (bought out) by a procedure introduced by the Ecclesiastical Dilapidations Measure 1923 (14 & 15 Geo. 5. No. 3).

=== Liability-free parishes ===
In a majority of parishes there is a vicar, and crucially the historic university college or other rectory-owning major landowner only sold their land free from tithe under the Tithe Acts so they, or more commonly, the local church, bear the liability for the local chancel. In a minority of parishes a rector persists and his/her predecessors in that role never sold any land, as permitted after 1836, while granting the new owners the right to levy a rentcharge, automatically co-opting all successors to that land to potential liability for the chancel, or conducted a similar sale with a "merger of tithes", or saw part of an inclosure act swap glebe for common.

In liable ecclesiastical parishes, only a minority have exercised their rights to apportion the cost of chancel repairs among the affected landowners, despite the common nature of checks and insurance.

=== Wallbank case ===
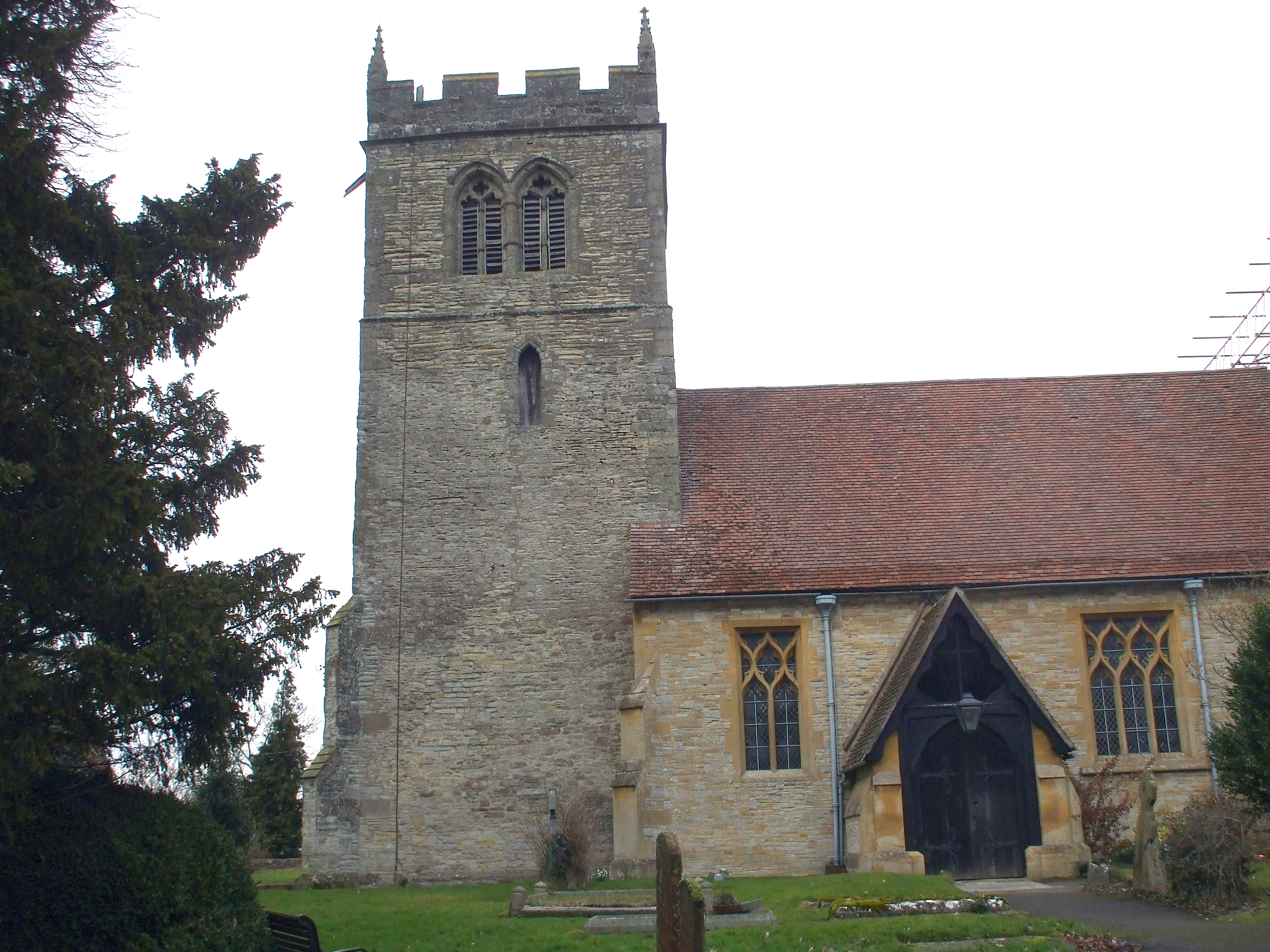
Medieval-built church where this liability applied in Aston Cantlow. Its historic rectorship was acquired by a monastery, abbey or college of Oxford or Cambridge leaving a discharged vicarage

In the vast majority of ecclesiastical parishes (into which all of England and Wales is split) chancel repair liability is not applicable. However, it was brought into use for the first time in a few years in 2003 in a particularly lightly populated glebe. Andrew and Gail Wallbank received a demand for almost £100,000 to fund repairs of their parish's medieval church at Aston Cantlow in Warwickshire. After a protracted legal battle, as they sought to challenge this ruling, the Law Lords found in favour of the parochial church council, leaving the Wallbanks with a £350,000 bill including legal costs.

The case is constitutionally significant for finding that a parochial parish council is not a "core public authority" under the Human Rights Act 1998.

The historic rectory of St John the Baptist church, Aston Cantlow was acquired by the Priors of Maxstoke in 1345 (Note: The County History also states: The rectory land was administered as a manor. The Bishop of Worcester received a pension from the land of 13s 4d for having granted it. The Priors of Maxstoke enjoyed in addition an income of 30s. from lands and tenements Following the Reformation in 1542 this pension passed to the Dean and Chapter of Worcester. In 1535 the farm of the rectory was worth £24 and the vicarage £9 9s. 7d....Their son Francis Browne sold the manor and rectory to Fulke Greville, Lord Brooke in 1622 By 1743 Lord Brooke held 12-yard-lands and the corn tithes of the greater part of the parish. In the Inclosure Award that year he was compensated as lay rector with a holding of 347 acres which included the present Glebe Farm, on which is still charged the maintenance of the chancel of the church.) leaving a "discharged vicarage" (as the name for the living of the priest) and creating lay impropriators (lay rectors) of the glebe land – e.g. in 1848 this was the Earl of Abergavenny. He held the glebe land, in this case helpfully named Glebe Farm, so was responsible for the chancel. Later buyers of this land remain liable.

=== Registration of liability ===
Subsequent to the 2003 case, it became best practice for new purchasers to be advised to request a check as to whether the local parish (one of the 15,000 ecclesiastical parishes into which all of England and Wales is split) included an older rector's church, not evolved from a chapel but now with a vicar, and if so to take out chancel liability insurance. Unless such a check was made, homeowners who had lived in their property since before 2003 were unlikely to be aware of their liability or to have insurance, as chancel repair liability would not have been registered on their title and may not have been researched by their conveyancers on purchase. If it was not noticed by solicitors and the church enforced the liability across the affected land, action against the solicitors may be time-barred after six years.

Through provisions made under the power of the Land Registration Act 2002, the onus was put on parochial church councils to identify all affected land and register their interest before 13 October 2013. (Note: That was the date on which the Land Registration Act 2002 (Transitional Provisions) (No. 2) Order 2003 ceased to have effect.) This means that chancel repair liability is no longer an "overriding interest" protected under the Land Registration Act 2002. The assumption has been made that, since that date, new owners of land are only bound by chancel repair liability where it was already entered on the Title Register database kept by the Land Registry. The Law Society expressed doubts about this in 2006. (Note: Law Society of England and Wales, 2006 Submission to HM Government; see footnote 18 on page 9. The reason is that it is unclear that a parochial church council's right to claim all or part of the cost of repairs to the chancel from a lay rector is actually an interest in the lay rector's land, and no change has been made to the Chancel Repairs Act 1932 to give a lay rector a defence to a claim under the Act based on non-registration. Only interests in land require registration at the Land Registry.)

Some parochial church councils have therefore followed the process in order to secure a valuable asset. Others may have concluded that registering the right to claim chancel repair was likely to damage the church's mission or reputation in the local community, and have taken no action.

An online petition to the Prime Minister requesting legislation to remove this liability resulted in the following response in 2008:

Chancel Repair Liability has existed for several centuries and the Government has no plans to abolish it or to introduce a scheme for its redemption. The Government has, however, acted to make the existence of the liability much simpler to discover. From October 2013, chancel repair liability will only bind buyers of registered land if it is referred to on the land register. By that time, virtually all freehold land in England and Wales will be registered. The Government believes that this approach strikes a fair balance between the landowners subject to the liability and its owners who are, in England, generally Parochial Church Councils and, in Wales, the Representative Body of the Church in Wales. The Government acknowledges that the existence of a liability for chancel repair will, like any other legal obligation, affect the value of the property in question, but in many cases this effect can be mitigated by relatively inexpensive insurance. It is for the parties involved in a transaction to decide whether or not to take out insurance.

Peter Luff, MP for Mid Worcestershire led an adjournment debate in the House of Commons on 17 October 2012 to seek a change in the law, above and beyond the required registration entries and notifications on all affected properties by 13 October 2013. The minister responsible was not convinced that a change was necessary at the time.

=== Chancel Repairs Bill 2014 ===
On 16 July 2014, Lord Avebury gave the first reading to a new Chancel Repairs Bill, which would have had the effect of ending all liability of lay rectors for the repair of the chancels of churches and chapels in England.

Lord Avebury caused to be printed these Explanatory Notes. This Bill made no further progress in the session of Parliament, and, consequently, it has been "lost" – the bill is no longer before Parliament.

== See also ==
- Valor Ecclesiasticus (1535)
- St Mary Our Lady, Sidlesham, in West Sussex – where the chancel was at one point allowed to fall down after an apparent dispute over who should maintain it.
