= Thomas William Marshall =

Thomas William Marshall may refer to:

- Thomas William Marshall (controversialist) (1818–1877), Catholic controversialist
- Thomas William Marshall (painter) (1875–1914), English painter

== See also ==
- Thomas Marshall (disambiguation)
