= Thomas Marshall =

Thomas Marshall may refer to:

== Law and politics ==
- Thomas Marshall (fl. 1376), MP for Somerset
- Thomas Marshall (fl. 1421), MP for Kingston upon Hull
- Thomas Marshall (Virginia politician, born 1730) (1730–1802), American politician and soldier, father of U.S. Supreme Court Chief Justice John Marshall
- Thomas Marshall (Virginia politician, born 1784) (1784–1835), grandson of above and Virginia delegate
- Thomas Marshall (Canadian politician) (1864–1951), also known as Thomas A. Marshall, MLA in Ontario, Canada
- Thomas A. Marshall (1794–1871), U.S. representative from Kentucky
- Thomas F. Marshall (North Dakota politician) (1854–1921), U.S. representative from North Dakota, 1901–1909
- Thomas Francis Marshall (1801–1864), U.S. representative from Kentucky, 1841–1843
- Thomas R. Marshall (1854–1925), vice president under Woodrow Wilson, 1913–1921
- Thomas C. Marshall (1851–1911), pioneer, lawyer, judge, and mayor of Missoula, Montana
- Thomas Marshall (Illinois politician) (1817–1873), lieutenant governor of Illinois
- Thomas Marshall (Maine politician) (1826–1861), American politician and military commander from Maine
- Thomas Hay Marshall (1770–1808), lord provost of Perth, Scotland
- Thomas O. Marshall (1920–2003), associate justice and chief justice of the Supreme Court of Georgia

== Religious figures ==
- Thomas Marshall (abbot of Colchester) (died 1539), Roman Catholic priest
- Thomas Marshall (dean of Gloucester) (1621–1685), English scholar and Anglican priest
- Thomas Marshall (archdeacon of Lincoln), 16th-century English priest

== Military ==
- Thomas Marshall (general) (1793–1853), brigadier general of volunteers during the Mexican–American War
- Thomas W. Marshall Jr. (1906–1942), officer in the United States Navy 1930–1942

== Sportsmen ==
- Thomas Roger Marshall (1849–1913), Scottish rugby player
- Thomas Marshall (footballer, born 1858) (1858–1917), England international footballer from the 1880s
- Thomas Marshall (footballer, fl. 1898–1906), played for Bolton Wanderers and Burnley in the 1900s

== Other people ==
- Thomas Marshall (settler) (c. 1610–1664), English emigrant to the New England Colonies
- Thomas Marshall (songwriter) (c. 1806 – 1866), Newcastle-born songwriter
- T. H. Marshall (Thomas Humphrey Marshall, 1893–1981), British sociologist
- Thomas William Marshall (controversialist) (1818–1877), Catholic controversialist
- Thomas William Marshall (painter) (1875–1914), English painter
- Thomas Ansell Marshall (1827–1903), English reverend and entomologist
- Thomas Falcon Marshall (1818–1878), English artist
- Thomas C. Marshall Jr. (died 2019), philanthropist, historian and antique car collector
- Thomas Marshall (died 1900), Flannan Isles lighthouse keeper who famously disappeared without trace
- Thomas H. Marshall, author of The Irish Necromancer published in 1821

== Other uses ==
- SS Thomas R. Marshall

== See also ==
- Tom Marshall (disambiguation), a Liberty ship, named after Thomas R. Marshall
