= Convocations of Canterbury and York =

Church of England synodical assemblies

The Convocations of Canterbury and York are the synodical assemblies of the bishops and clergy of each of the two provinces which comprise the Church of England. Their origins go back to the ecclesiastical reorganisation carried out under Archbishop Theodore of Canterbury (668–690) and the establishment of a separate northern province in 733. Until 1225 the synods were composed entirely of bishops, but during the thirteenth century more and more clergy were cited until by 1283 the membership was established as the bishops, deans, archdeacons and abbots of each province together with one proctor (representative) from each cathedral chapter and two proctors elected by the clergy of each diocese. The main purpose of the convocations was to take counsel for the well-being of the church and to approve canonical legislation, but in practice much time was spent in discussing the amount of tax to be paid to the Crown since the clergy were a separate estate of the realm and refused to be taxed in or through Parliament. Before the end of the nineteenth century, the Convocation of Canterbury, which was numerically very much larger, played the major role and the activity of the Convocation of York was often little more than giving formal approval to the decisions taken by the southern province.

In 1534 the convocations were subjected to the control of the Crown since they were a focus of resistance to Henry VIII's policies at the time of the Reformation and they continued to function in a restricted way under the supervision of the Crown. In 1603/4 they approved the updating and consolidation into one text of much of the Canon law of the Church of England and in 1661 after the restoration of Charles II they approved the text of the revised Book of Common Prayer before it was submitted to Parliament. Four years later, Archbishop Sheldon agreed to surrender the right of the clergy to tax themselves and as a result the convocations ceased to be licensed for business on a regular basis. Between 1688 and 1717 political tensions ran high between the lower houses which were predominately high church in theology and often Jacobite politically and the bishops who were mainly Whigs and latitudinarians and after 1717 their meetings were limited to the formal sessions required at the beginning of a new parliament.

Pressure for the reactivation of the convocations began to mount in the 1840s as people began to realise that the Church of England and the state were no longer coterminous and that the Church of England needed to find some means of expressing its mind and will; Henry Phillpotts, Bishop of Exeter, was a leading figure in pressing for their revival. In 1852 the Lower House of Canterbury acted on its own initiative and held a proper debate and from then on, despite strong opposition, many doubts and much debate, both houses of Canterbury gradually increased the range of their activities. York followed suit in 1861 after the death of Archbishop Thomas Musgrave.

In 1919 the two convocations approved a constitution for the proposed National Assembly of the Church of England in which the laity of each province would have full participation along with the four houses of the convocations themselves. They also petitioned Parliament that the new assembly might have the right to transmit legal measures to Parliament where they would either be approved as they stood and then receive royal assent (and so become part of the law of the land) or be rejected. This was granted at the end of the same year. The convocations lost none of their rights and the assembly could neither issue doctrinal statements nor purport to define the doctrine of the Church of England. However, by the Synodical Government Measure 1969 the overlapping functions of the assembly and the convocations were virtually eliminated by the establishment of the General Synod of the Church of England to which almost all their functions and powers were transferred. The convocations still exist, in part because their approval is required for certain legislative proposals and in part because the House of Bishops and the House of Clergy of the General Synod are constituted by the members of the corresponding houses of the convocations.

== Structure ==
When clergy other than bishops began to take part in the convocations they sat together with the bishops in one single assembly and technically even today the members still constitute one single body. However, since the fifteenth century each convocation has sat as two houses: an upper house of bishops and a lower house of other clergy. The division into houses has led to claims from time to time that the lower house is independent from the upper one in the same way as the House of Commons is from the Lords. Business is normally started in the House of Bishops and sent to the House of Clergy for approval which may be refused. There are procedures by which the lower house may raise matters and submit their opinions and suggestions to the bishops.

The president of each convocation as a whole and of the upper house is the archbishop of its province; each lower house elects for itself a president known as the prolocutor who is responsible for communication with the upper house.

Until 1920, the upper houses had consisted of the diocesan bishops of the province and the lower houses were mainly composed of church dignitaries, the deans and archdeacons and one proctor representing each cathedral chapters and to these ex officio members were added in the case of Canterbury two representatives elected by the clergy of each diocese and in York two representatives from each archdeaconry. Today all diocesan bishops have a seat in their province's convocation; the suffragan bishops of a province elect a few from among themselves to join them. Most of the members of the lower house are elected by the clergy of each diocese by proportional representation from among their number, although a handful serve ex officio or are elected by special constituencies (such as universities or cathedral deaneries). (Note: For a convenient detailed listing see Membership of General Synod.)

By virtue of their membership of convocation bishops and clergy are members of General Synod; thus the members of the convocations now all attend sessions of General Synod and can always conveniently meet during recesses of that body (which is, indeed, the only time they do meet nowadays).

== History ==
=== Before 1295 ===
Prior to 1295, the Church in England had assembled in diocesan and provincial synods to regulate disciplinary and other matters interesting the body of the clergy. Moreover, the archbishops, bishops, abbots and priors used to take their place in the national council on account of the estates they held in chief (in capite) of the English Crown. But the beneficed clergy took no part in it.

The increasing frequency of royal appeals for money grants and the unwillingness of the bishops to be responsible for allowing them had brought Stephen Langton, Archbishop of Canterbury, as early as 1225, to summon proctors of cathedral, collegiate and conventual churches to attend his provincial synod, and gradually that representative principle became part of the system of Convocation. The failure of the irregular attempt of Edward I Plantagenet to convoke the clergy at Northampton led him to issue (1283) a writ to the Archbishop with a view to Convocation meeting in London in that same year, and at that meeting a "benevolence" was duly voted.

=== After 1295 ===
In addition to the Baronage and Commons of the realm, after 1295 a representative body of the beneficed clergy summoned to attend personally in Parliament, the summons being conveyed by the insertion, in the bishop's writ of summons to Parliament, of the praemunientes clause. That summons was the beginning of a new phase in the long struggle waged by the Crown on the subject of the taxation of the clergy. It was to facilitate the obtaining of money grants that Edward I endeavoured once more to unite representatives of the clergy and laity in one deliberative assembly, composed on the basis of temporal property. To have countenanced the attempt would have been to recognize the Crown's claim to tax church property, and the clergy insisted upon their constitutional right of making their money grants in Convocation. The struggle between the Crown and the clergy continued until 1337, when the Crown gave way, though retaining the proemunientes clause in the bishop's writ of summons. Authorities differ as to whether the Parliamentary proctors of the clergy sat in the Lower House or in the Upper House; most probably they sat and voted in the Lower House.

The question of the exact relation of Convocation to the newer parliamentary representatives of the clergy is obscure; nor is the obscurity lessened by the fact that the proctors of the clergy for Convocation were frequently the same persons as the proctors of the clergy for Parliament. Two opinions have found defenders: one that the older ecclesiastical council fused with the Parliamentary representatives of the clergy; the other, that by the process of gradual decay of parliamentary representation of the clergy, part of their rights passed to the ecclesiastical councils, thus giving rise to the historical connection between the convocations and Parliament. The latter view, ably advocated by Stubbs, holds the field.

The division of Convocation into an Upper and a Lower House came about gradually, and was not formed, as is sometimes supposed, on the model of the two Houses of Parliament. In 1296 the members of Convocation resolved themselves for deliberative purposes into four groups: bishops, monastic representatives, dignitaries and proctors of the clergy. Eventually convocation came to open with a joint session presided over by the archbishop, after which the bishops and abbots remained to deliberate as the Upper House, while the rest withdrew to deliberate as the Lower House.

The objection of the clergy to sitting in Parliament lessened their influence over that body; at the same time they secured the right of meeting when Parliament met, and that right of meeting involved the right of petitioning and to some extent of legislating for themselves. That idea of Convocation as the clerical parliament had important consequences; the right to tax church property was successfully maintained; but the clergy could neither elect nor be elected to the House of Commons, making a person in Holy orders ineligible for Westminster Parliament. At the same time the legislation of Convocation was binding on the clergy only and not upon the laity.

=== The Reformation period ===
Convocation lost its independence and saw its powers curtailed by the Act of Submission, which enacts that Convocation can only meet by royal command, and that without royal leave and licence no new canons, constitutions or ordinances may be made. This act was repealed in Queen Mary I Tudor's reign, but revived by Elizabeth I (in 1558-9), and still remains in full force.

The climax of Convocation's degradation was reached when, after the Act of Supremacy (1534), Thomas Cromwell, the representative of King Henry VIII, though a layman, asserted his right to preside, a right never subsequently exercised.

=== Post-Reformation period ===
The Act of Submission of Henry VIII was stringently interpreted by the judges at a committee before the Lords in Parliament as forbidding, even after obtaining royal assent, any canon either against the prerogative of the king, against common law, against any statute law or against any custom of the realm. The loss of legislative independence paved the way for the loss of taxing powers, which were finally renounced in 1665, the right of voting at Parliamentary elections being obtained in return. The power of Convocation of dealing with cases of heresy has been exercised but rarely, and then to no purpose.

It continued to be convoked at the beginning of each Parliament, but its sittings were interrupted from 1640 to 1660 (being largely replaced by the puritan Westminster Assembly of Divines), to be resumed after the Stuart Restoration. In 1689, in view of the opposition of the clergy to the Toleration Act of William III and Mary II, no summons was issued to Convocation. The Commons, however, protested against the innovation, and their petition had its effect; at the same time Archbishop Tillotson, and to some extent his successor Tenison, met the difficulties of the situation by refusing to allow any deliberations. Convocation was summoned, met and was prorogued. Parties were formed and claims were made, insisting upon the independence of the Lower House on the analogy of the House of Commons. Atterbury led the malcontents; Wake, afterwards Archbishop of Canterbury, Kennett, Hoadly and Gibson led the defence. The question was really a political one. Toryism dominated the Lower House; Liberalism, alike in politics and theology, pervaded the Upper House. Permission to deliberate led to trouble in 1701, and prorogation followed.

The Bangorian Controversy arising out of Hoadly's sermon led to similar results in 1717. The opposition of the Lower House was worn out by repeated prorogations immediately following the opening session, and with the exception of the discussions allowed in 1741 and 1742, Convocation ceased to be a deliberative body until 1852.

=== Modern times ===
The old organization having survived, many earnest Anglicans of the early nineteenth century, anxious to revive the synodal life of the Anglican Church, sought and obtained the relaxation of the customary immediate prorogation. A brief session was authorized in 1852. (The example was followed by York in 1859.) The action of Convocation as a deliberative body began in 1861, when, at its own request, the Crown licensed it to amend the twenty-ninth of the canons of 1603 on the subject of sponsors, and although no result followed, new canons were passed in 1865, 1887 and 1892.

Apart from such general authorizations the Crown also possesses the right to submit definite business to the consideration of Convocation. This is done by "Special Letters of Business", a method used in 1872 and in 1907, in submitting the reports of the ritual commissioners to its consideration.

Arthur Featherstone Marshall wrote a trenchant parody of the Church of England's Convocation debates in his pseudonymous The Comedy of Convocation of the English Church (1868). Its characters include Deans Blunt, Pliable, Primitive, Pompous and Critical; Archdeacons Jolly, Theory and Chasuble; and Doctors Easy, Viewy and Candour.

Lay representation developed from the House of Laymen, which first met in connection with the Convocation of Canterbury in 1886 (York, 1892), and formally in legislation in the Church Assembly (1919) and General Synod (1970).

The legislative functions have been transferred to the General Synod.

==== Church of England Convocations Act 1966 ====
Church of England Convocations Act 1966 (Note: Section 2.)
- Act of Parliament
- Parliament of the United Kingdom
- Long title: An Act to make further provision with respect to the duration of the Convocations of the provinces of Canterbury and York.
- Citation: 1966 c. 2
- Introduced by: George Thomas (Commons); Frank Soskice (Lords)

Dates
- Royal assent: 24 February 1966
- Commencement: 24 February 1966 (Note: The Acts of Parliament (Commencement) Act 1793.)

Other legislation
- Amended by: Statute Law (Repeals) Act 2004

Status: Amended

Text of statute as originally enacted

Revised text of statute as amended

Text of the Convocations of Canterbury and York as in force today (including any amendments) within the United Kingdom, from legislation.gov.uk.

The Church of England Convocations Act 1966 (c. 2) establishes the two convocations as bicameral gatherings of bishops and representative clergy. Resolutions made before the Convocations continue to carry influence, even though legislative powers have been transferred.

Under the act, each Convocation is dissolved five years after being summoned, with the original convocations at the time of the act having six years before they would next be summoned. The act allows the convocations to be dissolved at His or Her Majesty's pleasure. The Act has provisions for the procedure for the death of the Monarch, which would need to be repealed for a single Act to describe this procedure.

The monarch is required to summon new convocations as soon as "may be convenient" after the dissolution of the previous convocation. Convocations can no longer be suspended, as was the case in the 18th century. The demise of the monarch does not automatically summon a new convocation.

Elections under the act to the convocations occur through the single transferable vote (STV). The reason for using this electoral system rather than others is that STV is a form of proportional representation, and therefore gives a significant weight to minority viewpoints and also requires more than one representative for each constituency.

The last election held under the act was in 2021.

== See also ==
- Convocation of 1563
