= Allied Artists Association =

English art exhibiting society

The Allied Artists Association (AAA) was an art exhibiting society based in London in the early 20th century.

== History ==
The Allied Artists Association was founded by Frank Rutter, an art critic of The Sunday Times newspaper, in 1908.

Its purpose was to provide a platform for the exhibition and promotion of modernist art in Britain. The AAA organised exhibitions at various venues, most notably an annual Salon, modelled partly on European Secessionist exhibitions, and particularly the Société des Artistes Indépendants in Paris. In an advertisement for the AAA in 1917, in the literary journal Art and Letters, it was announced that the aim of the AAA was to organise exhibitions without the use of a selecting jury, with each member having 'the right to show any three works he (or she) pleases and to have one work hung on the line.'

The Irish painter Paul Henry was a founder member of the AAA, and exhibited in its first exhibition at the Royal Albert Hall in 1908. As did Vanessa Bell. Wyndham Lewis, Christopher Nevinson, and Harold Gilman exhibited at the 1912 AAA show at the Royal Albert Hall, and it was also at this exhibition that the novelist Michael Sadleir bought the works by the expressionist painter Wassily Kandinsky, the first time work by this artist had been seen in Britain. Wyndham Lewis and Edward Wadsworth both exhibited Vorticist compositions at the AAA show held at the Holland Park Ice Rink in June 1914. The English post-impressionist painter Thomas William Marshall, living in Paris, was also a founder member of the AAA, and exhibited oils painting and watercolours at the Royal Albert Hall from 1908 to 1914.

In June 1917, the AAA held a show at the Grafton Galleries, London, where the art critic, poet, and novelist Herbert Read sold a number of abstract drawings.
