= Tom Marshall =

Tom Marshall may refer to:

- Tom Marshall (actor), British actor
- Tom Marshall (artist) (born 1988), British photo colouriser and artist
- Tom Marshall (basketball) (1931–2024), basketball player and coach
- Tom Marshall (Bible teacher) (1921–1993), international Bible teacher
- Tom Marshall (poet) (1938–1993), Canadian poet and novelist
- Tom Marshall (politician) (born 1946), Newfoundland and Labrador politician
- Tom Marshall (singer) (born 1963), American singer/songwriter known for his association with the band Phish
- Tom Marshall (rugby union) (born 1990), New Zealand rugby union player
- Tom Marshall (runner) (born 1989), Welsh middle-distance runner and competitor at the 2018 Commonwealth Games

== See also ==
- Thomas Marshall (disambiguation)
