= Albert H. Robinson =

Canadian painter (1881-1956)

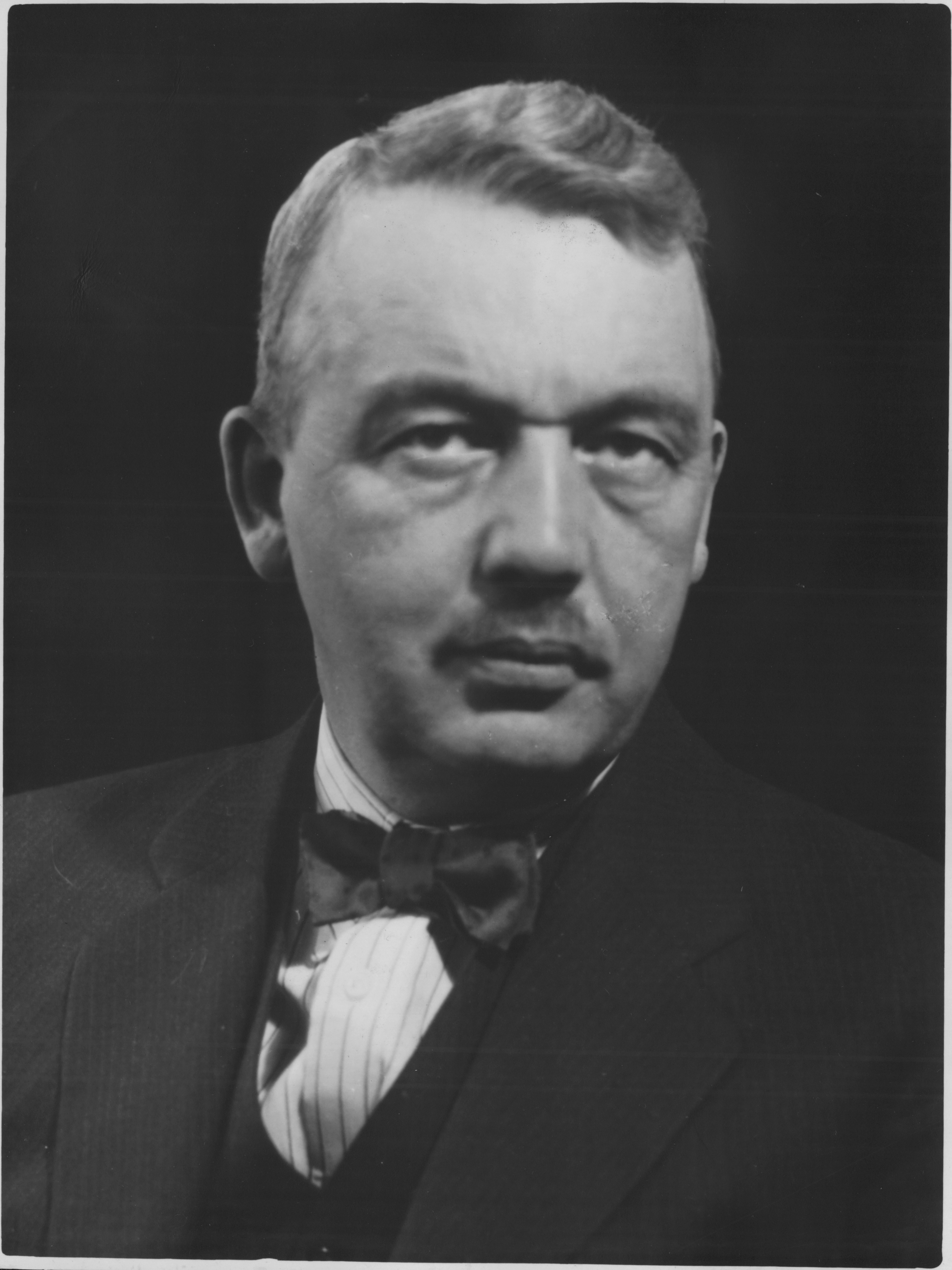
- Robinson in 1929
- Born: Albert Henry Robinson; January 2, 1881; Hamilton, Ontario
- Died: September 7, 1956 (aged 75); Montreal, Quebec
- Education: Hamilton Art School with John S. Gordon; Académie Julian with William-Adolphe Bouguereau and École des Beaux Arts with Gabriel Ferrier, Paris (1903) and also with the American Thomas William Marshall (painter) in Normandy and Corsica (1903–1905)
- Movement: Impressionism
- Spouse(s): Marion Ethelwynne Russell, married 1952
- Awards: Member in 1920, Royal Canadian Academy
- Elected: founding member, Beaver Hall Group, Montreal in 1920, and of the Canadian Group of Painters, 1933; Pen and Pencil Club, Montreal, 1911

Albert Henry Robinson RCA, also known as Albert H. Robinson and as A. H. Robinson (January 2, 1881 – September 7, 1956) was a Canadian landscape painter, an invited contributor to the first Group of Seven exhibition in 1920, as well as a founding member of the Beaver Hall Group in 1920 and the Canadian Group of Painters in 1933. He used the rolling rhythm of landscape parallel to the picture plane used by A.Y. Jackson, with whom he often painted on trips to Quebec, but endowed his work with unusual colours – corals, pinks, dark blue. He sought simplified, powerful form

== Career ==
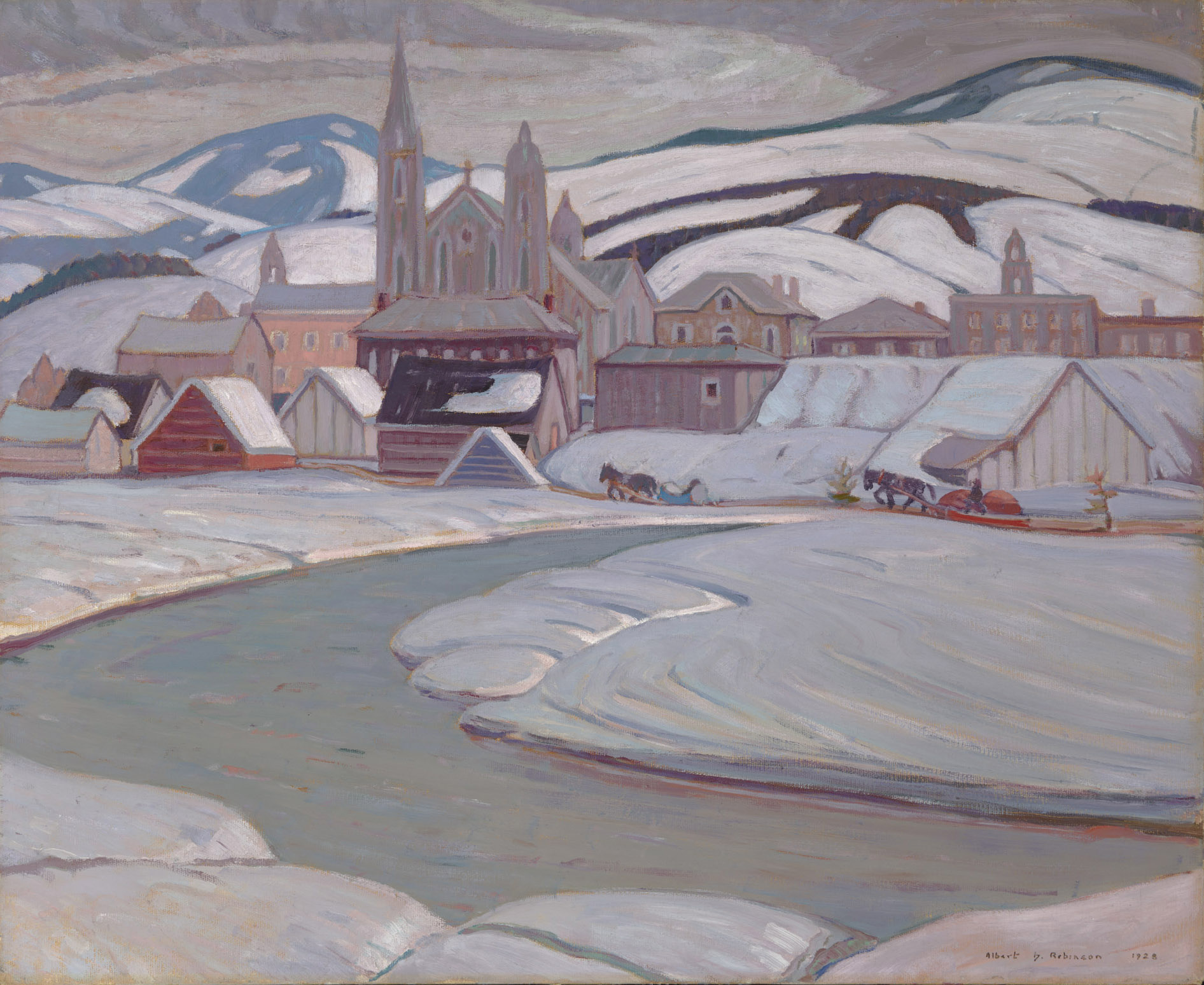
Baie-Saint-Paul by Albert Henry Robinson

Born in Hamilton, Ontario, Albert Henry Robinson's first studies were with John S. Gordon at the Hamilton Art School. In 1903–1904, he was in Paris, studying first at the Académie Julian with Bouguereau and Bashet then at the École des Beaux-Arts with Gabriel Ferrier, and also with artist, Thomas William Marshall.

About 1908, he began to paint the Quebec landscape and moved to Montreal. In 1910, he met A.Y. Jackson and went with him the next year to France, visiting St. Malo and Carhaix in Brittany. In 1911, he was elected an associate of the Royal Canadian Academy of Arts and that year was in Europe again. In 1920, he became an academician.

His career included serving in the war industry as inspector of munitions during World War I (1917–1919). He was commissioned by the Canadian War Memorials to paint the Vickers Shipbuilding plant in Montreal.

From about 1918 to 1933, Robinson painted on trips along the St. Lawrence River and in the Laurentians with Jackson, Clarence Gagnon, Edwin Holgate and Randolph Hewton. In 1921, he painted with Jackson at Cacouna where he made studies for Returning from Easter Mass. Despite travelling to the south shore of the Saint Lawrence River with Jackson in 1921, Robinson preferred to paint the north shore where, throughout the 1920s and into the early 1930s, he made annual trips in Beaupré and Charlevoix counties.

His work was gaining recognition abroad when he had to retire due to a heart attack. When he recovered from the heart attack, it was followed by arthritis. By 1936 he had ceased to paint.

His dealer was William R. Watson of Watson Art Galleries, then Walter Klinkhoff Gallery, Montreal and today, Alan Klinkhoff Gallery in Montreal and Toronto and Eric Klinkhoff Gallery in Montreal. In 1982, Jennifer Watson for the Kitchener-Waterloo Art Gallery curated a retrospective exhibition which travelled to seven other galleries, Albert H. Robinson: The Mature Years; in 1994, Walter Klinkhoff Gallery organized a retrospective with a catalogue.

== Selected public collections ==
Robinson's work is in the National Gallery of Canada, Ottawa; the Art Gallery of Ontario, Toronto; the Art Gallery of Hamilton; McMichael Canadian Art Collection, Kleinburg; Montreal Museum of Fine Arts the Musée national des beaux-arts du Québec; and the Musée National d'Art Moderne, Paris, among others.

== Memberships ==
He was a member of the Pen and Pencil Club of Montreal and the Arts Club of Montreal. He was also elected a member of the Royal Canadian Academy of Arts in 1920, the same year in which he participated as a guest artist at the inaugural exhibition of the Group of Seven in Toronto. He also was a founding member of the Beaver Hall Group in 1920 and the Canadian Group of Painters in 1933.

== Record sale prices ==
At the Cowley Abbott Auction of An Important Private Collection of Canadian Art – Part III, December 6, 2023, lot #116, Robinson's La Malbaie, oil on canvas, 22 x 26.25 ins ( 55.9 x 66.7 cms ), Auction Estimate: $70,000.00 - $90,000.00, realized a price of $168,000.00.
