= Thomas Marshall (footballer, fl. 1898–1906) =

English footballer

Personal information
- Full name: Thomas Marshall
- Place of birth: England
- Position: Winger

Senior career*
Years	Team	Apps	(Gls)
1898–1904	Bolton Wanderers	4	(0)
1904–1906	Burnley	23	(4)
- * Club domestic league appearances and goals

Thomas Marshall was an English professional footballer who played as a centre forward for Bolton Wanderers and Burnley around the turn of the twentieth century.
