= Arthur Featherstone Marshall =

Arthur Featherstone Marshall (9 January 1828 – at least 1883) was an English Anglican priest who converted to Roman Catholicism in the 1860s.

== Life ==
He was the son of John Marshall, who in the premiership of Sir Robert Peel was government agent for colonising New South Wales. His elder brother Thomas William Marshall (1818–1877) was also a Roman Catholic convert and controversialist.

Marshall abandoned his curacy at Liverpool to become a Roman Catholic in the early 1860s. He subsequently published satirical (mostly pseudonymous) material on the Anglican principle of comprehensiveness and a trenchant criticism of opponents of the First Vatican Council, especially Old Catholics. Specific Anglican tenets he singles out for attack include the Branch theory and the sacramental validity of Anglican ministry and holy orders. In November 1883 he applied unsuccessfully to the Royal Literary Fund.

== Bibliography ==
- Pseud., The Comedy of Convocation in the English Church, in Two Scenes, edited by Archdeacon Chasuble. (1868)
- Pseud., The 'Old Catholics' at Cologne, by Herr Fröhlich (1873)
- The Oxford Undergraduate of Twenty Years Ago (1874)
- The Comedy of English Protestantism in Three Acts: Scene—Exeter Hall, London, Time—the Summer of 1893 (1894)
