= Thomas William Marshall (painter) =

English painter (1875–1914)

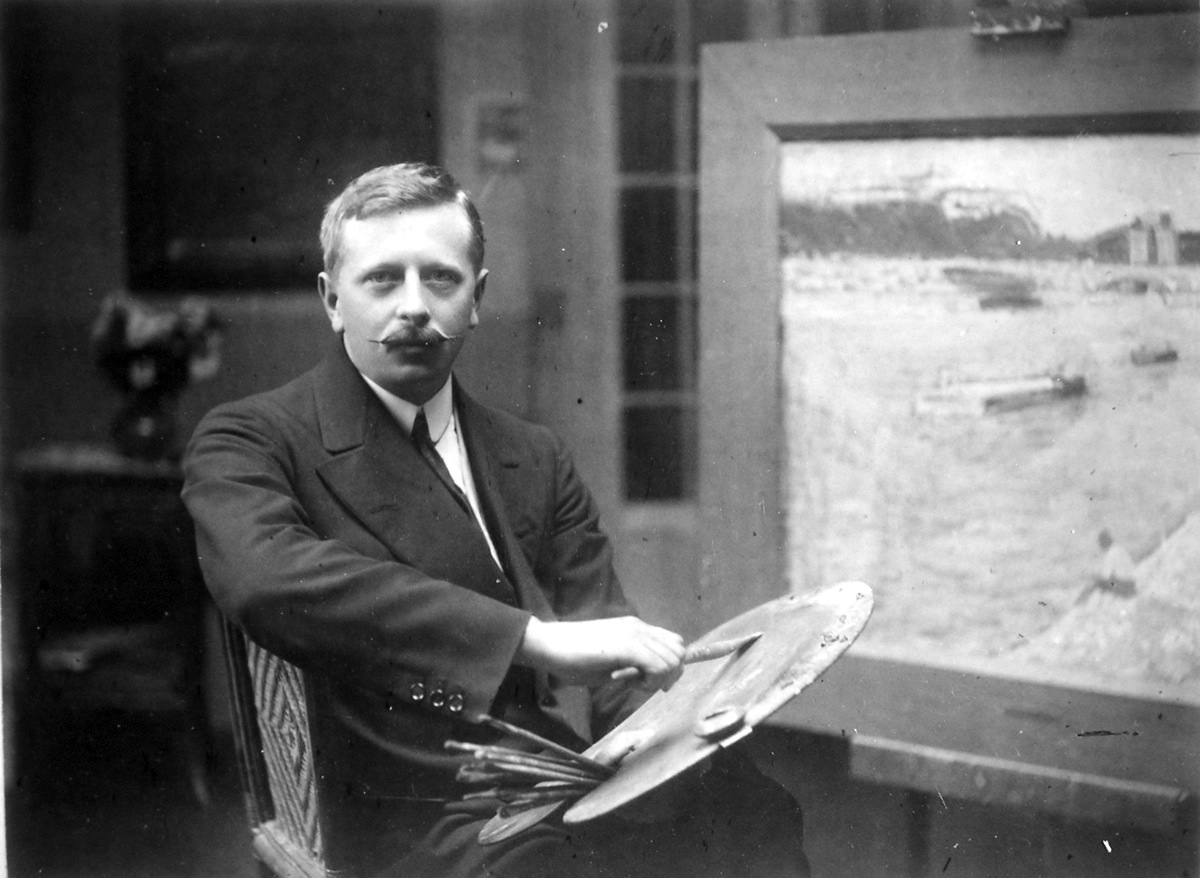
- Thomas William Marshall (1875-1914).
- Born: October 17, 1875; Donisthorpe, Derbyshire
- Died: September 2, 1914 (aged 38); Paris
- Resting place: Père Lachaise, Paris
- Education: Académie Julian, Paris
- Known for: Painting
- Movement: Post-Impressionism

Thomas William Marshall was an English Post-Impressionist painter and water colorist, born on October 17, 1875 at Donisthorpe in England. He died on September 2, 1914 in Paris.

He painted landscapes, portraits, nudes and produced watercolours, in Paris, in Île-de-France, in Normandy, on the French Riviera and in Corsica. Between 1904 and 1914, He exhibited his work in Paris at the Salon d'Automne, as well as the Salon des Indépendants and also at the Nationale des Beaux-Arts. These art salons were at the peak of their glory, in this era, with well known painters such as Marquet, Modigliani, Sickert, Kandinsky, participating in them.

== Biography ==
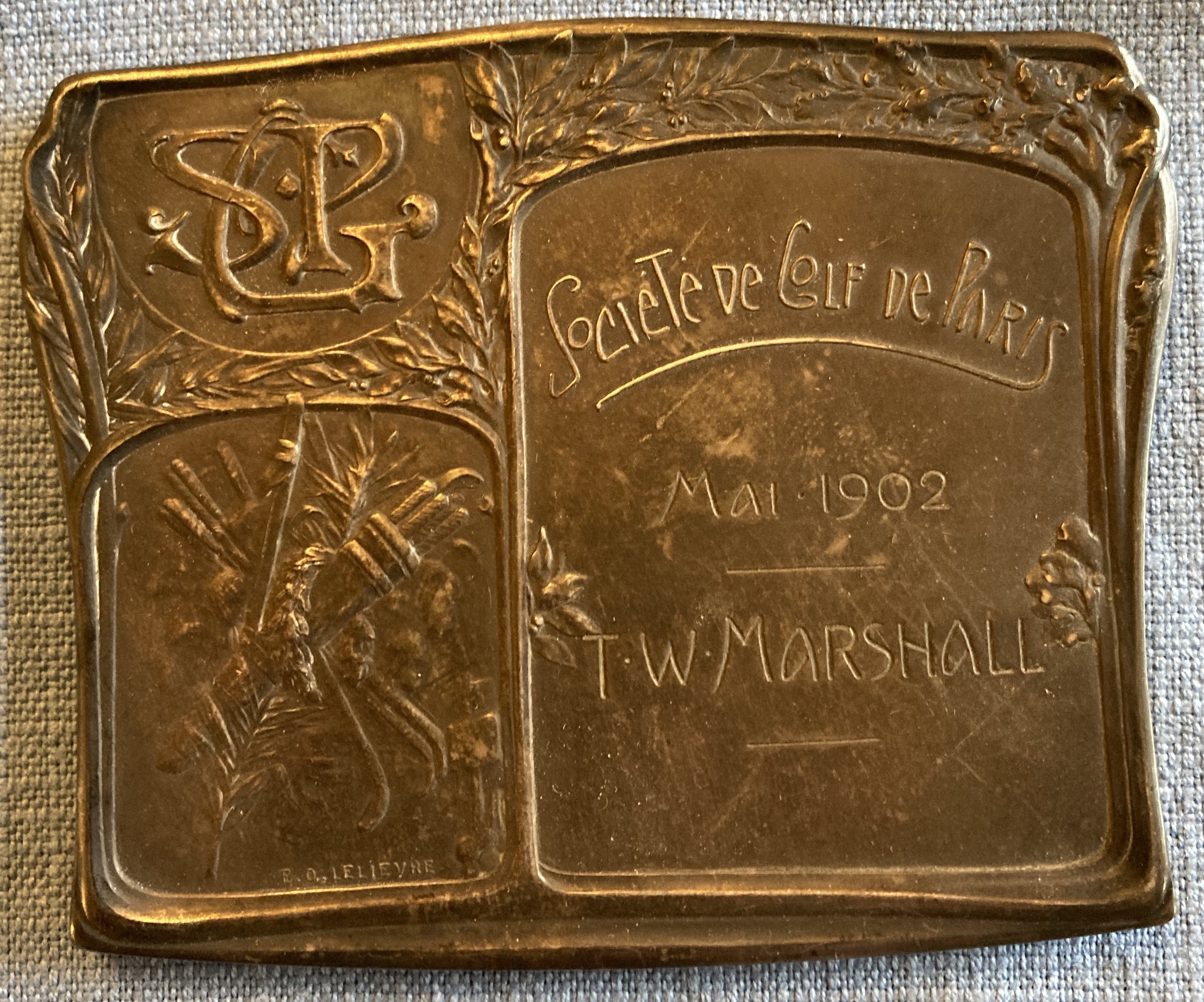
Medal from Société de Golf de Paris (1902).

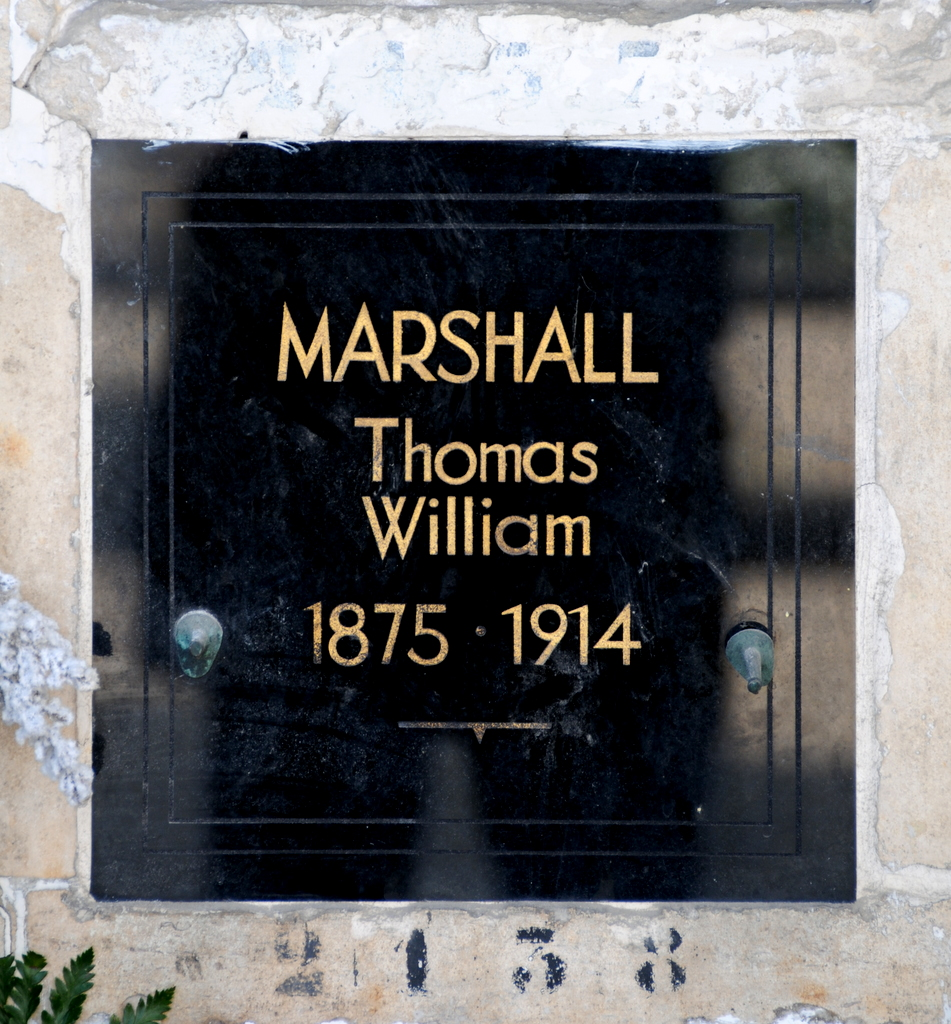
Niche at the columbarium of Père-Lachaise.

Thomas William Marshall was born in 1875 in Donisthorpe, Derbyshire in England. He was the son of Robert Aldred Marshall (1852–1884) a wealthy mining engineer from Nottinghamshire who died in the Bullhouse Bridge rail accident, and Dorothy Ann Tarr (1852–1879). He is a first cousin of the rugby player Frank Tarr. Thomas William studied in both Oxford and in Cambridge.

Wishing to become a painter despite his fragile health, he left England to live in Paris in 1897 and enrolled in the Académie Julian. There he met the Canadian painter Albert Henry Robinson, who would become his student and friend. In Paris he was reunited with his English friends, also painters, such as Ernest Yarrow Jones (1872–1951). As of 1900, he began to participate successfully in some Parisian exhibitions. His studio was located at 3 rue Campagne-Première, he then moved to 51 rue de Sèvres, and then relocated to 49 boulevard du Montparnasse.

In 1904, he participated for the first time in the Salon d'Automne where he would show an average of five to six paintings or watercolours per salon, every year until 1913. He was named as a member of the Salon in 1908. During this time, he showed works at the Salon des Indépendants in 1906 and then from 1908 to 1914. He also showed his works at the Nationale des Beaux-Arts in 1911 and at the London Salon (of the Allied Artists Association) in London from 1908 to 1914. Thomas William Marshall was one of the founding members of the London Salon with Walter Sickert.

Thomas William Marshall was a member of the Golf Club of Paris (Société de golf de Paris) and played at the golf de La Boulie when he started. Therefore, he produced many drawings and caricatures inspired by this sport.

Due to his fragile health, he left for the Côte d'Azur and settled in Corse in 1908, where he produced a large part of his body of work (oil on canvas or on cardboard, watercolours and caricatures). He transferred works he had created in Corsica onto canvas:landscapes and scenes inspired by daily life on the island back to Paris for exhibition. These works gained him much praise from the art critics of that era.

In 1910, Thomas William Marshall married Marie-Louise Désagullier who had been his companion and model for many years. He died prematurely from tuberculosis on September 2, 1914 in Paris, at the age of 38, at the height of his talent. He was cremated at cimetière du Père-Lachaise and his ashes are resting at the columbarium (87th division, niche n° 2137).

Wealthier than many of the contemporary artists of his time, he did not really need to sell much of his art to live; as a result, he remained relatively unknown until his rediscovery by art critic Yann Le Pichon in 1984. One of Thomas William Marshall's paintings, a landscape of Corsica painted in 1910, was selected by a specialized jury and art lovers, displayed at the Espace Pierre Cardin at the Champs-Élysées and was reproduced in colour in an edition of the magazine Paris-Match in December 1984.

Many exhibitions to honour his work followed: at the Salon des Indépendants in Paris in 1986, at the Salon d'Automne in 1987 where an entire room was dedicated in tribute to him, and two personal exhibitions in Bastia in 1988 and in Villefranche-sur-mer in 1993. The Beauvais museum acquired a painting in 1987. Bastia and Villefranche-sur-Mer museums each have conserved one or more of his works in their public collections.

== Works ==
Recognized by Jacques Foucart, general curator at the Paintings Department of the Musée du Louvre, the pictorial work of the English painter Thomas William Marshall, is both inspired by the last sparkling embers of the 19th century and by the end of Impressionism. Composed of numerous oil paintings and watercolours, of rare quality, his work can be added to the Post-Impressionist and symboliste movements. Also certain pieces could be considered neo-Japonard or nabis. Regardless of how one classifies it, his work remains deeply original.

Some work of T.W. Marshall in private collections
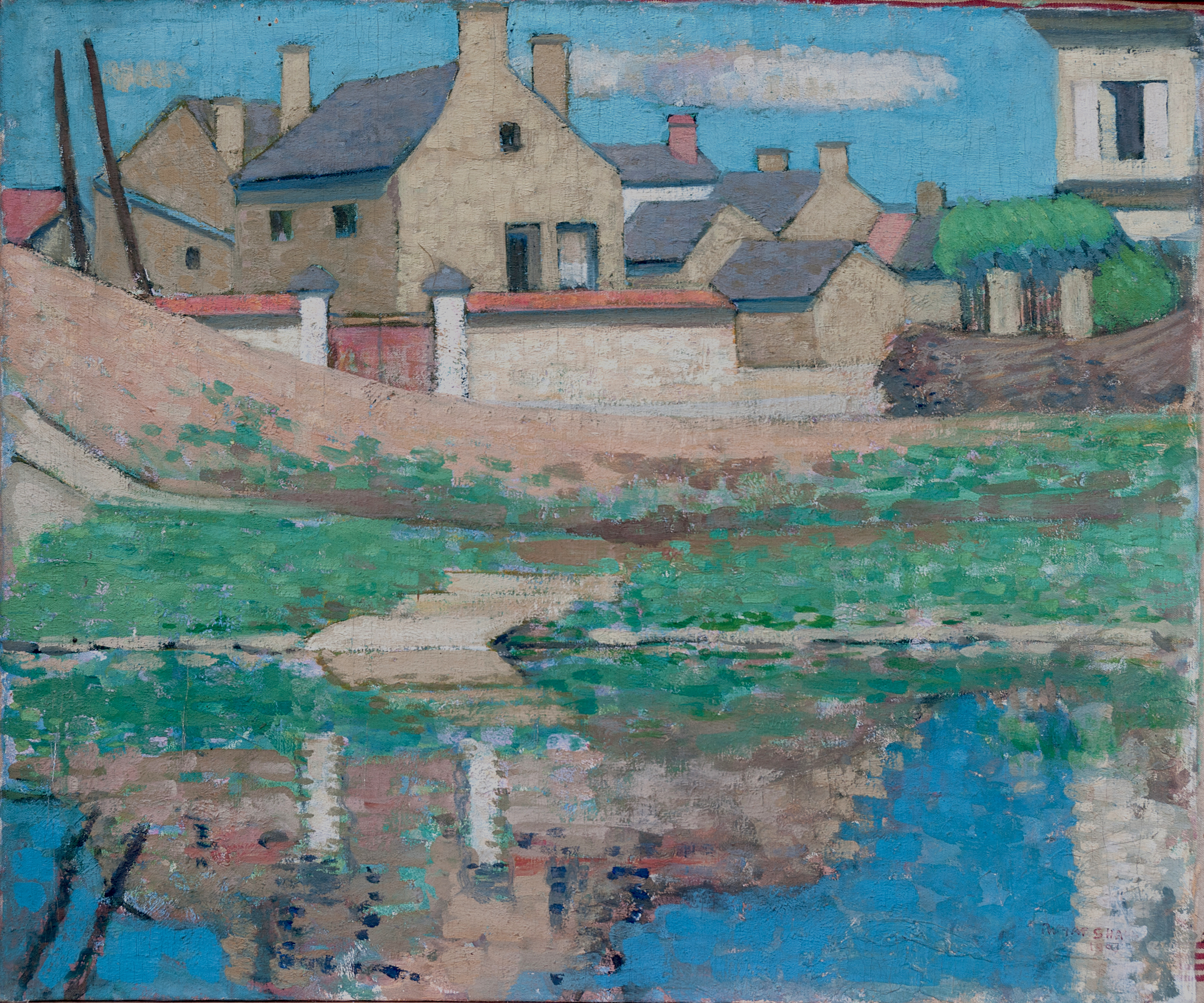
Maison et reflets sur l'eau en Île-de-France (oil on canvas, (1905).

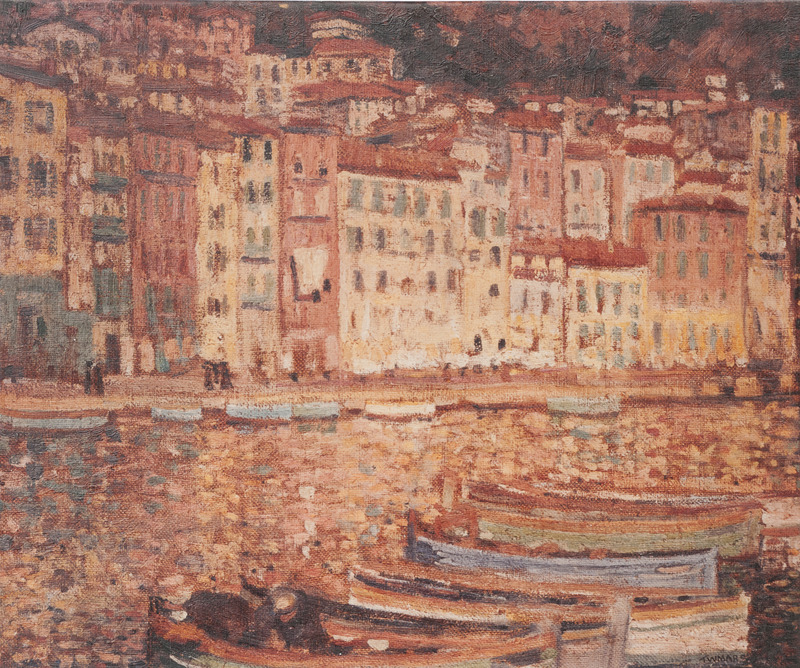
Le Port de Villefranche-sur-Mer (oil on canvas, 1906).

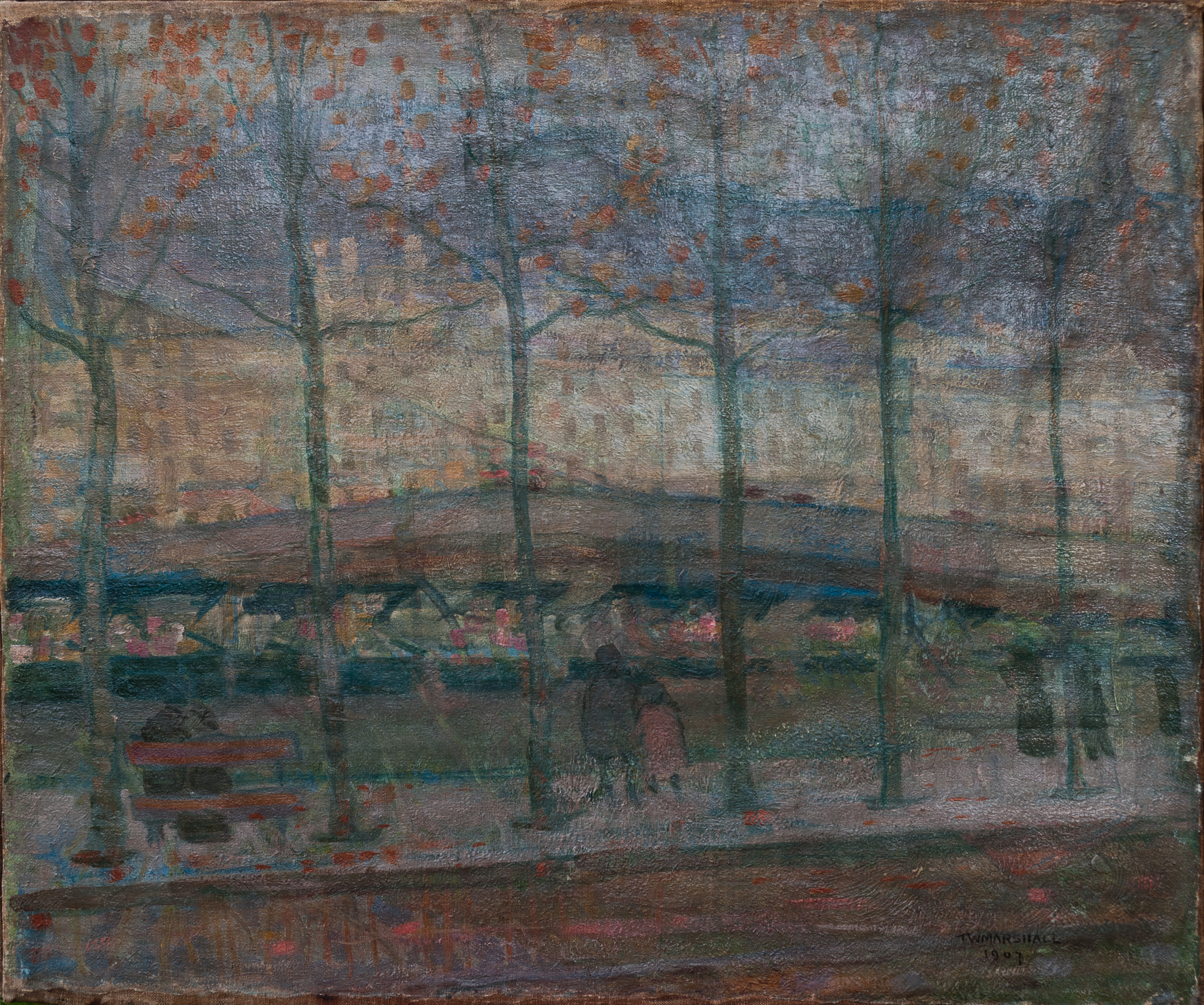
Les Bouquinistes (Paris) (oil on canvas, 1907).

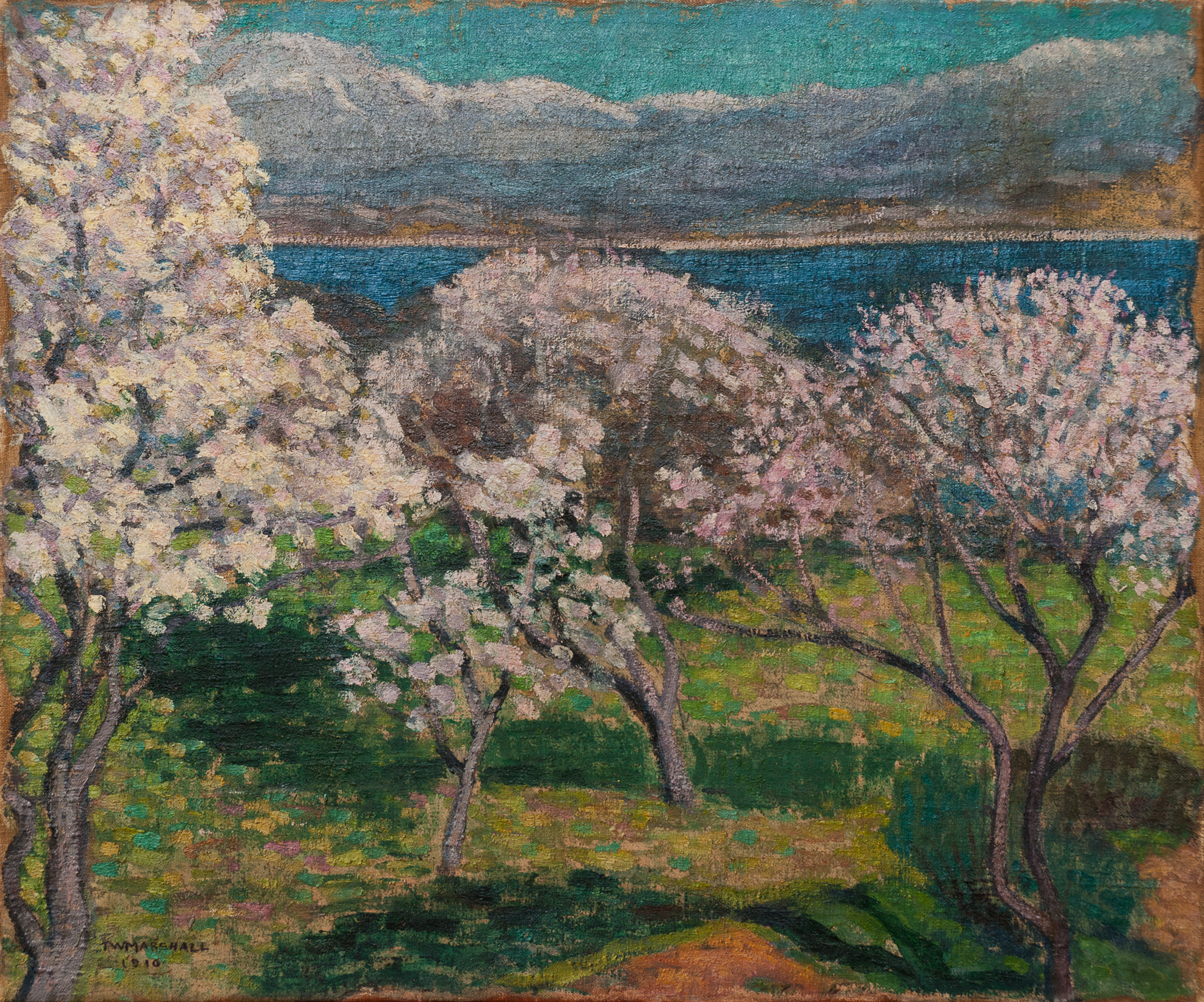
Amandiers en fleur au bord de la mer (Corse) (oil on canvas, 1910).

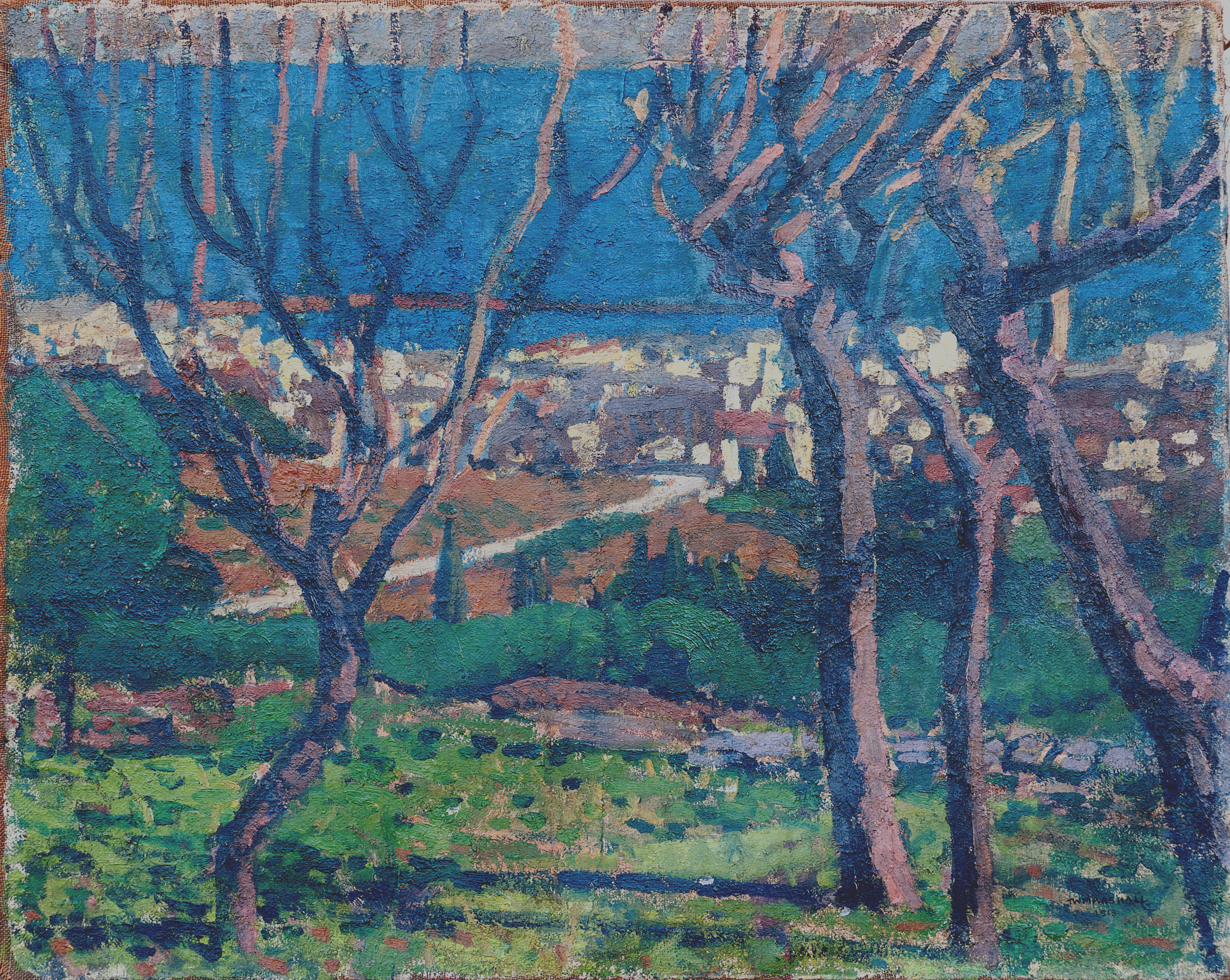
Rade de Bastia à travers les arbres (oil on canvas, 1913).

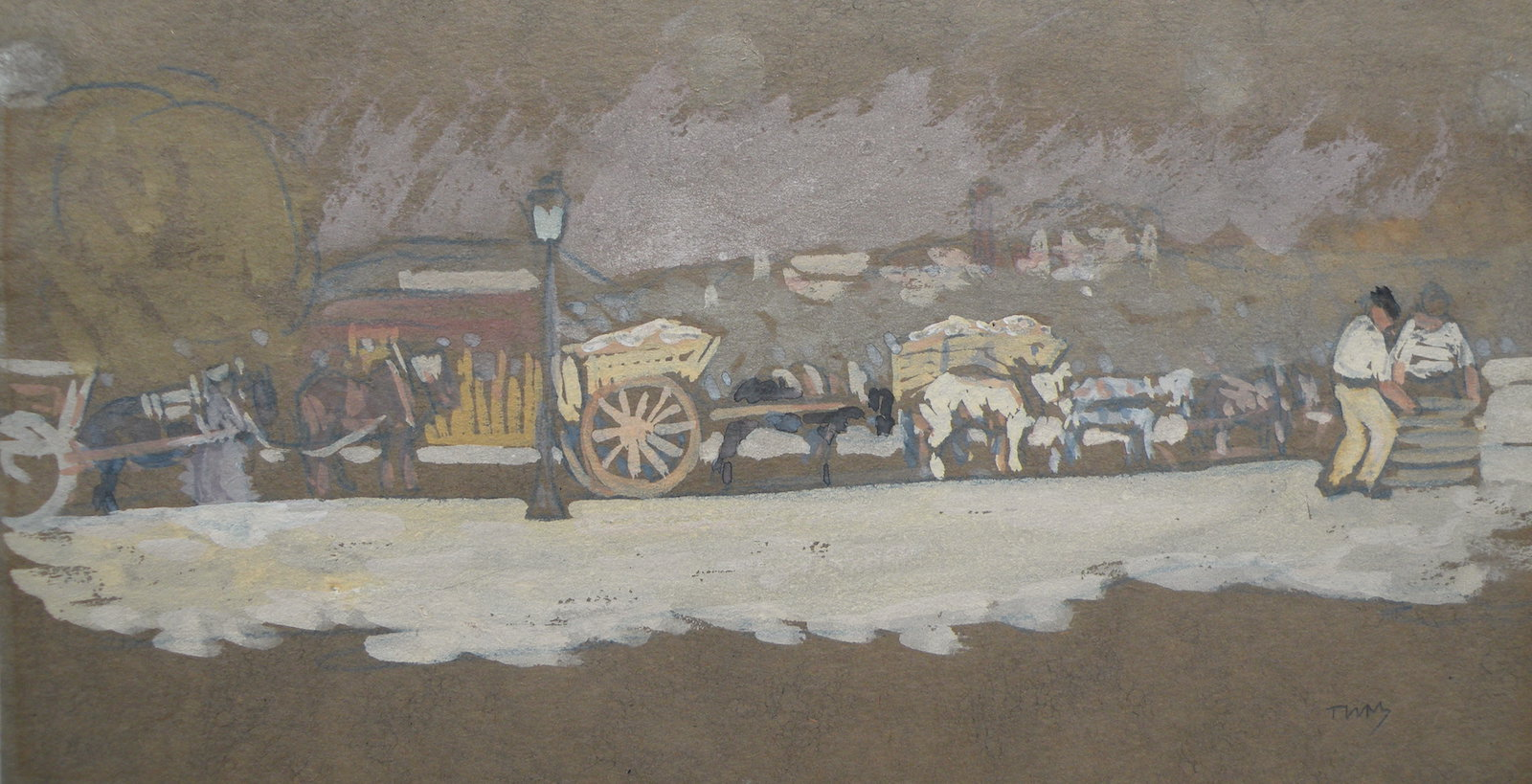
Les Charrettes en hiver (watercoulour).

== Exhibitions ==
=== Salon d'Automne (1904–1913 and 1987) ===
Work exhibited at Salon d'Automne 1904

- 866. Poigny (landscape).
- 867. Printemps (Spring).
- 868. Le Pommier - The Apple Tree.
- 869. Le Petit Cottage - The Little Cottage.
- 1571. Paysage - Landscape (watercolour).
- 1572. Le Petit Paris, Dieppe - Dieppe, the Little Paris (watercolour).
- 1573. Une vieille ruelle - An Old Alley (landscape, watercolour).

Work exhibited at Salon d'Automne 1905

- 1050. Sunshine and shadow (pastel).
- 1051. Bords du Canal St-Vinnemer - The banks of St. Vinnemer Canal (pastel).
- 1052. Villefranche (pastel).
- 1053. Verger - Orchard (pastel).
- 1054. La « Miekmaid » - The "Miekmaid" (watercolour).
- 1055. Les Oies - The Geese (watercolour, pastel).
- 1056. Chaumière - Thatched Cottage (watercolour).

Work exhibited at Salon d'Automne 1906

- 1148. Bords de la Seine (temps gris) - Banks of The Seine (Grey Weather).
- 1149. Canal (temps gris) - Canal (Grey Weather).
- 1150. Crue de la Seine - Flooding of The Seine.
- 1151. Peupliers - Poplars.
- 1152. Reflet (Villefranche) - Reflection (Villefranche).
- 1153. Le Tub - The Tub.

Work exhibited at Salon d'Automne 1907

- 1223. Les Citronniers, à Villefranche-sur-Mer - The Lemon Trees at Villefranche-sur-Mer.
- 1224. Coin de Terrasse (Jardin du Luxembourg) - Terrace Corner (Luxemburg Garden).

Work exhibited at Salon d'Automne 1908

- 1358. Pietranera.
- 1359. Amandiers printemps (Corse) - Almond Tree, Spring (Corsica).
- 1360. Citroniers à Villefranche - Lemon Trees at Villefranche.

Work exhibited at Salon d'Automne 1909

- 1163. Vallée de Centiori (Cap Corse) - Centiori Valley (The Corsica Cape).
- 1164. Couvent de S. Martino-di-Lota (Corse) - S. Martino-di-Lota Convent.
- 1165. Pietranera (Corse) - Pietranera (Corsica).
- 1166. Temps gris à la montagne (Corse) - Grey Weather on the Mountain (Corsica).
- 1167. Chavenay (S.-et-O.).
- 1168. Intérieur (après déjeuner) - Inside (after lunch).

Work exhibited at Salon d'Automne 1910

- 821. Orangers, Ajaccio - Orange Trees, Ajaccio.
- 822. La Baie d'Ajaccio - The Bay of Ajaccio.
- 823. Gitanes au marché d'Ajaccio - Gypsies at the Ajaccio Market (watercolour).
- 824. Retour du marché - Back From the Market (watercolour).

Work exhibited at Salon d'Automne 1911

- 1065. Faverges (Haute-Savoie).
- 1066. Avant la moisson (Haute-Savoie) - Before the Harvest (Haute-Savoie).
- 1067. La Seine: au Pont Royal - The Seine: at the Royal Bridge.
- 1068. La Seine: Quai d'Orsay - The Seine: at the Orsay Quay.
- 1069. La Seine: du Pont des Arts - The Seine: at the Pont des Arts.
- 1070. La Seine: Pont des Invalides - The Seine: at the Invalids' Bridge.

Work exhibited at Salon d'Automne 1912

- 1142. Amandiers en fleurs, Minelli (Corse) - Flowering Almond Trees, Minelli (Corsica).
- 1143. Le Couvent de San Martino di Lota (Corse) - The San Martino di Lota Convent (Corsica).
- 1144. Les Amandiers fleuris (Corse) - The Flowering Almond Trees (Corsica).
- 1145. San Martino di Lota.

Work exhibited at Salon d'Automne 1913

- 1450. Bastia (Corse) - Bastia (Corsica).
- 1451. La Pique (montagne) (Corse) - The Peak (Mountain, Corsica).
- 1452. Le Couvent de St Antoine à travers les fourrés (Corse) - St Anthony Convent through the bushes (Corsica).
- 1453. Cyprès, couvent de Bastia (Corse) - Cypress, Bastia Convent (Corsica).
- 1454. La Pique sous la neige (Corse) - The Peak Under The Snow (Corsica).

Work exhibited at Salon d'Automne 1987

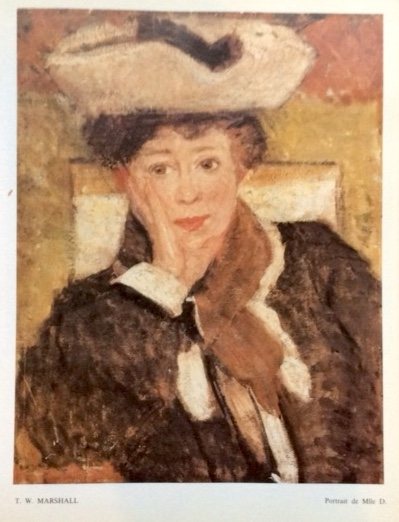
Portrait de Mlle D (1906) - Catalog of Salon d'automne 1987 =: Tribute to T. W. Marshall.

Tribute organized by Édouard Georges Mac-Avoy, President of the Salon d'Automne, at the time. 18 paintings were exhibited in a room, dedicated entirely to the former secretary T.W. Marshall, from October 23 to November 8, 1987.

- 1. Coin de terrasse au Luxembourg - Terrace Corner at Luxemburg Garden.
- 2. Les Quais de la Seine à Paris - The Quays of the Seine in Paris.
- 3. Le Port de Villefranche-sur-Mer - The Villefranche-sur-Mer Harbour.
- 4. L'Atelier à Montparnasse - The Studio at Montparnasse.
- 5. Portrait de Mlle D - Portrait of Miss D.
- 6. La Barque - The Boat.
- 7. Le Tub - The Tub.
- 8. Le Village de San Martino Di Lota (Corse) - The Village of San Martino Di Lota (Corsica).
- 9. Le ‘‘Libeccio’’ - The "Libeccio".
- 10. Amandier en fleurs - Flowering Almond Tree.
- 11. Portrait de Mrs Jones - Portrait of Mrs. Jones.
- 12. Verger en Normandie - Orchard in Normandy.
- 13. Les Oies - The Geese.
- 14. Figuiers de Barbarie - Barbary Fig Trees.
- 15. Village de Morsiglia (Corse) - Village of Morsiglia (Corsica).
- 16. Sous la tonnelle - Under the Arbor.
- 17. Bord de mer en Corse - Shores of Corsica.
- 18. Le Petit Cottage - The Little Cottage.

=== Salon des Indépendants (1906, 1908–1914, 1986) ===
Work exhibited at Salon des Indépendants 1906

- 3351. Le Pont des Arts.
- 3352. Portrait de M^{lle} D - Portrait of Miss D.
- 3353. Le Pont Royal.
- 3354. Merisier en fleurs - Flowering Cherrywood.
- 3355. Le Verger - The Orchard.
- 3356. Soleil d'été - Summer Sun.
- 3357. Effet de neige (Luxembourg) - Snow Effect (Luxemburg)
- 3358. Temps gris - Grey Weather.

Work exhibited at Salon des indépendants 1909

- 1686 to 1687 (2 paintings). Étude au cap Corse - Study at Corsica Cape.

Work exhibited at Salon des Indépendants 1910

- 3518 to 3523 (6 paintings). Étude d'amandiers fleuris, Ajaccio (Corse) - Study of Flowering Almond Trees, Ajaccio (Corsica).

Work exhibited at Salon des Indépendants 1911

- 4107. Citronniers d'Ajaccio - Lemon Trees of Ajaccio.
- 4108. La Baie d'Ajaccio - The Bay of Ajaccio.
- 4109. Pont Royal (aquarelle) - Royal Bridge (watercolour).
- 4110. Jardin du Luxembourg (aquarelle) - Luxemburg Garden (watercolour).
- 4111. La Seine à l'Alma - The Seine at Alma.
- 4112. Villefranche-sur-Mer.

Work exhibited at Salon des Indépendants 1912

- 2176. Le Parmelan (Hte Savoie) - The Parmelan (Haute Savoie).
- 2177. Amandiers rose - Pink Almond Trees.
- 2178. Amandier fleuri- Flowering Almond Trees.

Work exhibited at Salon des Indépendants 1913

- 2017. Cyprès (couvent de Bastia), Corse - Cypress (Bastia Convent), Corsica.
- 2018. Bastia à travers les arbres (Corse) - Bastia Through The Trees (Corsica).
- 2019. La Route de Saint-Florent (Corse) - The Road to Saint-Florent (Corsica).

Work exhibited at Salon des Indépendants 1914

- 2197 to 2199 (3 paintings). Paysage corse - Corsican Landscapes.

Work exhibited at Salon des Indépendants 1986

Tribute to T. W. Marshall with six paintings exhibited at the Grand Palais in Paris.

=== London Salon (1908–1914) ===
Work exhibited for the London Salon Allied Artist Association in London, at the Royal Albert Hall from 1908 to 1913 and at the Holland Park Hall in 1914.

Work exhibited at the London Salon, 1908

- 178. Grey day on the Seine.
- 179. Lemon trees - Villefranche.
- 180. Orange trees - Corsica.
- 181. Almond - Corsica.
- 182. Pietranera - Corsica.

Work exhibited at the London Salon, 1909

- 590. Morsiglia - Cape Corse.
- 591. The Valley of San Martino di Lota (Corsica).
- 592. Pietranera - Corsica.

Work exhibited at the London Salon, 1910 (section XVII)

- 490. Almond Blossom - Corsica.
- 491. Almonds and the Bay of Ajaccio.
- 492. Corner of the Lemon Grove - Ajaccio.

Work exhibited at the London Salon, 1911

- 470. Orange Trees - Ajaccio.
- 471. Villefranche sur mer.
- 472. The Last of the Apple Blossom - Poigny.

Work exhibited at the London Salon, 1912

- 218. Colette.
- 219. Valley of Chambery.
- 220. The Seine and the Louvre.

Work exhibited at the London Salon, 1913

- 428. Corsican Landscape.
- 429. Corsican Landscape.
- 430. Corsican Landscape.

Work exhibited at the London Salon, 1914

- Minelli près Bastia - Corsica.

=== Société Nationale des Beaux-Arts (1911) ===
Work exhibited at the Société Nationale des Beaux-Arts, 1911

- 914. Citronniers - Lemon Trees.
- 1614. Matinée de brume (carton) - Morning mists (cardboard).

=== Bastia Museum (June–September 1988) ===
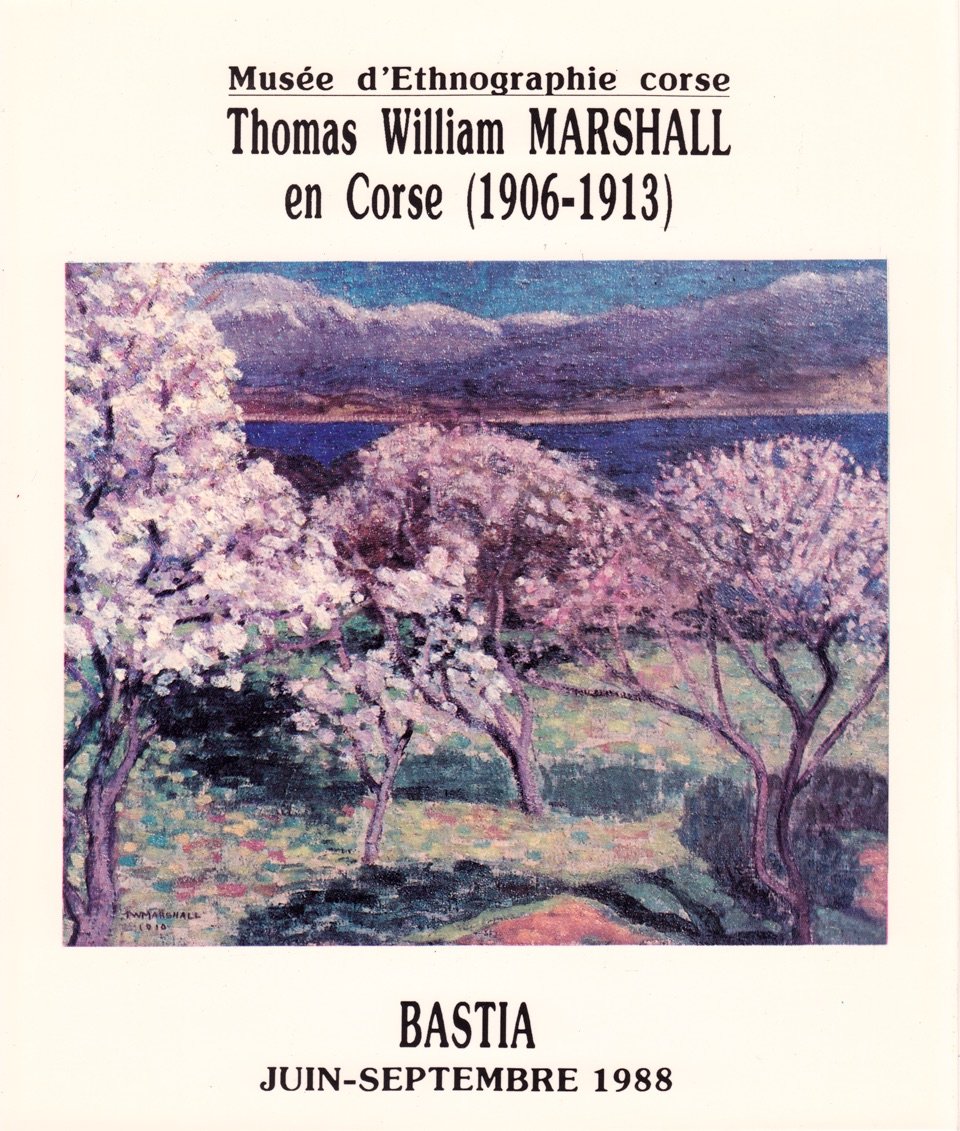
Exhibition poster Thomas William Marshall in Corsica (1906–1913) in Bastia in 1988.

Solo exhibition « Thomas William Marshall en Corse (1906-1913) » ("Thomas William Marshall in Corsica (1906-1913)") organized at the Palais des Gouverneurs génois (Bastia, Northern Corsica) by the Museum of Corsican Ethnography under the distinguished patronage of Bastia City Hall. The exhibition catalogue was prefaced by the art critic Yann Le Pichon with texts from Jacques Foucart (general curator of the Louvre Museum), Robert Marshall, Jean-Marc Olivesi and Janine Serafini-Costoli.

Oil Paintings on canvas

- Montagne rose avec arbre au premier plan - Pink Mountain with a Tree in the Foreground.
- Arbres en fleurs sur terrasse - Trees in Bloom on the Terrace.
- Baie d'Ajaccio avec nuages - Bay of Ajaccio with Clouds.
- Le Couvent de San Martino - San Martino Convent.
- Citronniers - Lemon Trees.
- Amandiers en fleurs devant un mur - Flowering Almond Trees in front of a Wall.
- Bord de mer en Corse - Seaside in Corsica.
- Village de San Martino di Lota - Village of San Martino di Lota.
- Rade de Bastia à travers les arbres - Bastia Harbour through the Trees.
- Vallées de Grisgione - Grisgione Valley.
- Pêcher en fleur - Flowering Peach Tree.
- Cyprès au pied de la montagne - Cypress at the Foothills of the Mountain.
- Village de Morsiglia - Village of Morsiglia.
- Citronniers devant un mur - Lemon Trees in front of a Wall.
- Amandiers en fleurs au bord de la mer - Flowering Almond Trees by the Sea.
- Orangers en bord de mer - Orange Trees by the Sea.
- Figuiers de Barbarie - Prickly Pears.
- Le Libeccio - The Libeccio.
- Pietranera.
- La villa Damei à Minelli près de Bastia - The Villa Damei at Minelli near Bastia.
- Paysanne dans un champ en bord de mer - Peasant Woman in a Field by the Sea.

Oil paintings on cardboards

- Arbres en bord de mer par temps gris - Trees by the Sea on a Cloudy Day.
- La Rade de Bastia - Bastia Harbour.
- Montagne enneigée - Snow-Covered Mountain.
- Berger avec mouton et arbres en fleurs - Shepherd with Sheep and Flowering Trees.
- Vue de Bastia - View from Bastia.

Watercolours

- Torrent de montagne sous un pont - Mountain Stream under a Bridge.
- Chalet dans la montagne - Cabin in the Mountain.
- Vallée de Grisgione - Grisgione Valley.
- Les Maisons dans la montagne - The Houses in the Mountain.
- Couvent de San Martino di Lota - San Martino di Lota Convent.
- Une rue de Morsiglia - A Street of Morsiglia.
- Scène de rue (curés et paysans) - Street Scene (Clerics and Peasants).
- La Rade de Bastia (avec 3 cyprès) - Bastia Harbour" (with 3 Cypress).
- Arbres en bord de mer - Trees by the Sea.
- Village dans la montagne - Village in the Mountain.
- La Baie d'Ajaccio - The Bay of Ajaccio.
- Voiture à âne sous la pluie - Donkey Cart in the Rain.
- Gitanes à Ajaccio - Gypsies at Ajaccio.
- Une ruelle à Bastia - An Alley in Bastia.
- Charrette à âne, cactus, figuiers de Barbarie - Donkey Cart, Cactus, Prickly Pear.
- Nuages sur la Montagne - Clouds over the Mountains.
- La Barque - The Boat.
- Coin de marché à Ajaccio - Market Corner in Ajaccio.
- Le Village de Morsiglia - The Village of Morsiglia.

Caricatures

- La Gardienne - The Babysitter.
- Le Chasseur - The Hunter.
- Le Vagabond - The Wanderer.
- Le Curé et le Paysan - The Cleric and the Peasant.

=== Villefranche-sur-Mer Citadelle (June 18 – August 20, 1993) ===
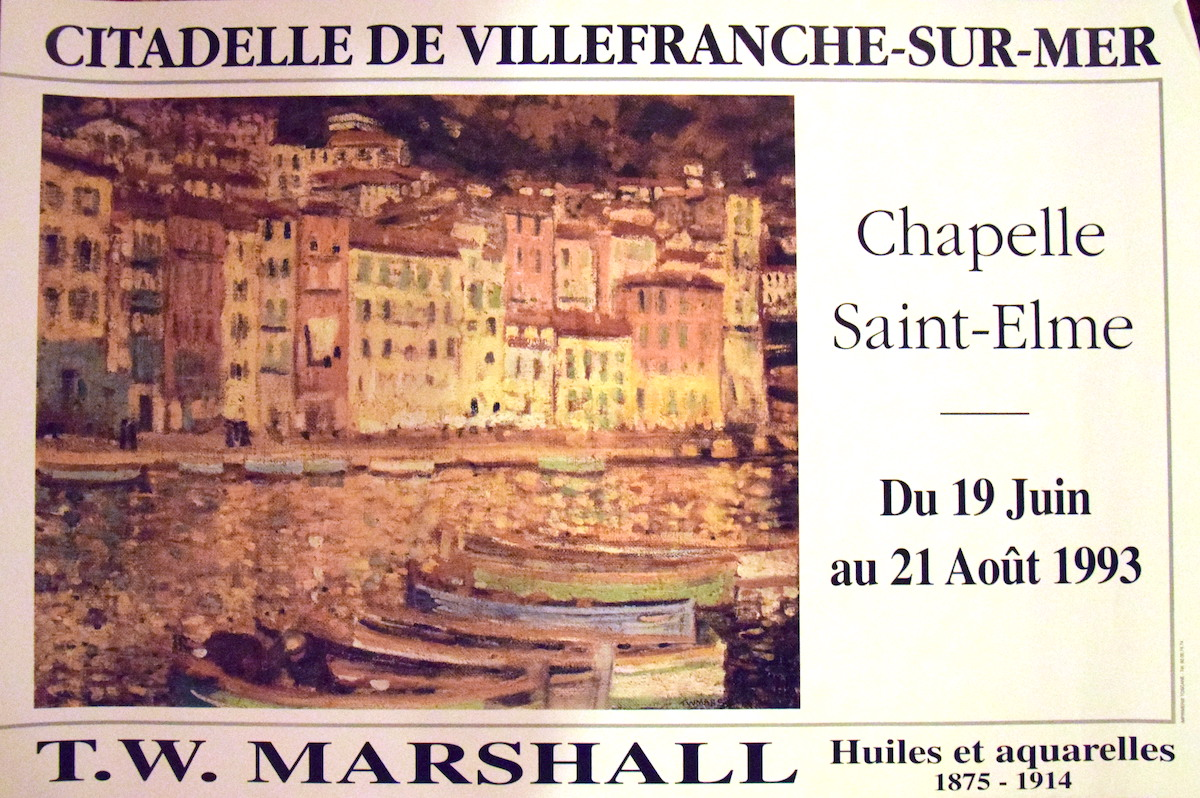
Exhibition poster Thomas William Marshall, Villefranche-sur-Mer Citadelle, 1993.

Solo exhibition « Rétrospective Thomas William Marshall » ("Thomas William Marshall Retrospective") of 18 paintings, organized at the Chapelle Saint Helme at Villefranche-sur-Mer. The exhibition catalogue was prefaced by Jacques Foucart, general curator at the Paintings Department of the Musée du Louvre. After the exhibition, the museum kept one painting within its public collection: « Reflet (Villefranche) » (Reflection, Villefranche, 1906).

Oil on canvas

Paris (nudes and portraits)

- 1 - Nu assis de dos
- 2 - Le Tub
- 3 - Portrait de Mrs Jones
- 4 - Le Berceau
- 5 - Sous la tonnelle
- 6 - Jeune femme lisant
- 7 - Portrait de Mr. Jones
- 8 - Jeune femme cousant

Landscapes of Île-de-France

- 9 - La Fenaison
- 10 - Le Manège au Jardin du Luxembourg
- 11 - Remorqueur devant le Musée du Louvre
- 12 - Les Bouquinistes
- 13 - La Barque
- 14 - Pont sur la Seine
- 15 - Le Jardin du Luxembourg
- 16 - La Seine par temps gris
- 17 - Le Bassin du Luxembourg

Normandie and Savoie

- 18 - La Chaumière
- 19 - Le Pommier
- 20 - Les Peupliers
- 21 - Nuages au dessus du village
- 22 - La Gardeuse d'oies
- 23 - Le Village
- 24 - Maisons derrière les peupliers
- 25 - L'Arbre et la Grille
- 26 - L'Église de Faverges

Villefranche-sur-Mer

- 27 - Le Port de Villefranche
- 28 - Les Barques
- 29 - La Barque et les reflets

Corsica

- 30 - La Rade de Bastia
- 31 - Arbres et terrasse
- 32 - Échappée sur la mer
- 33 - Les Citronniers
- 34 - Champs en fleurs
- 35 - Le Village de San Martino
- 36 - Baie d'Ajaccio et nuages
- 37 - La Vallée de Grisgione
- 38 - Figuiers de Barbarie
- 39 - Les Cyprès
- 40 - Amandiers en fleurs en bord de mer
- 41 - Le Village d'Erbalonga
- 42 - Amandiers en fleurs
- 43 - Le Libeccio
- 44 - Arbres, mer et montagnes
- 45 - Citronniers le long d'un mur
- 46 - Sous les châtaigniers

Watercolours

- 47 - Le Troupeau d'oies
- 48 - Les Charretiers à Paris
- 49 - Village de Savoie
- 50 - La Charrette à âne sous la pluie
- 51 - La Charrette à âne au soleil (en Corse)
- 52 - Remorque sur la Seine
- 53 - Les Barques à Villefranche-sur-Mer
- 54 - Péniches près du Pont Alexandre III
- 55 - Femmes au lavoir
- 56 - Place du marché à Bastia
- 57 - Nu debout
- 58 - Nu à genoux
- 59 - Le Bout de la jetée
- 60 - Au jardin du Luxembourg
- 61 - Le Bain du cheval
- 62 - Bateau à étages au Pont Neuf
- 63 - Les Ouvriers au travail
- 64 - La Baie d'Ajaccio
- 4 watercolours on postcards (Villefranche)
- 6 caricatures

== Works in public collections ==
Oise Museum, Beauvais (Oise)

- Amandiers en fleurs, Corse (Flowering Almond Tree, Corsica, 1910), oil painting.

Museum of Corsican Ethnography, Bastia (Northern Corsica)

- Montagne rose avec un arbre au premier plan (Pink Mountain with a Tree in the Foreground, 1912), oil painting 73 x 92 cm;
- Vue du couvent de San Martino di Lota (View from San Martino di Lota Convent, 1912), oil painting 73 x 92 cm.

Museum of Villefranche-sur-Mer (Alpes-Maritimes)

- Reflet, Villefranche - Reflection, Villefranche, 1906, oil painting.
Works of T.W. Marshall in the public collections
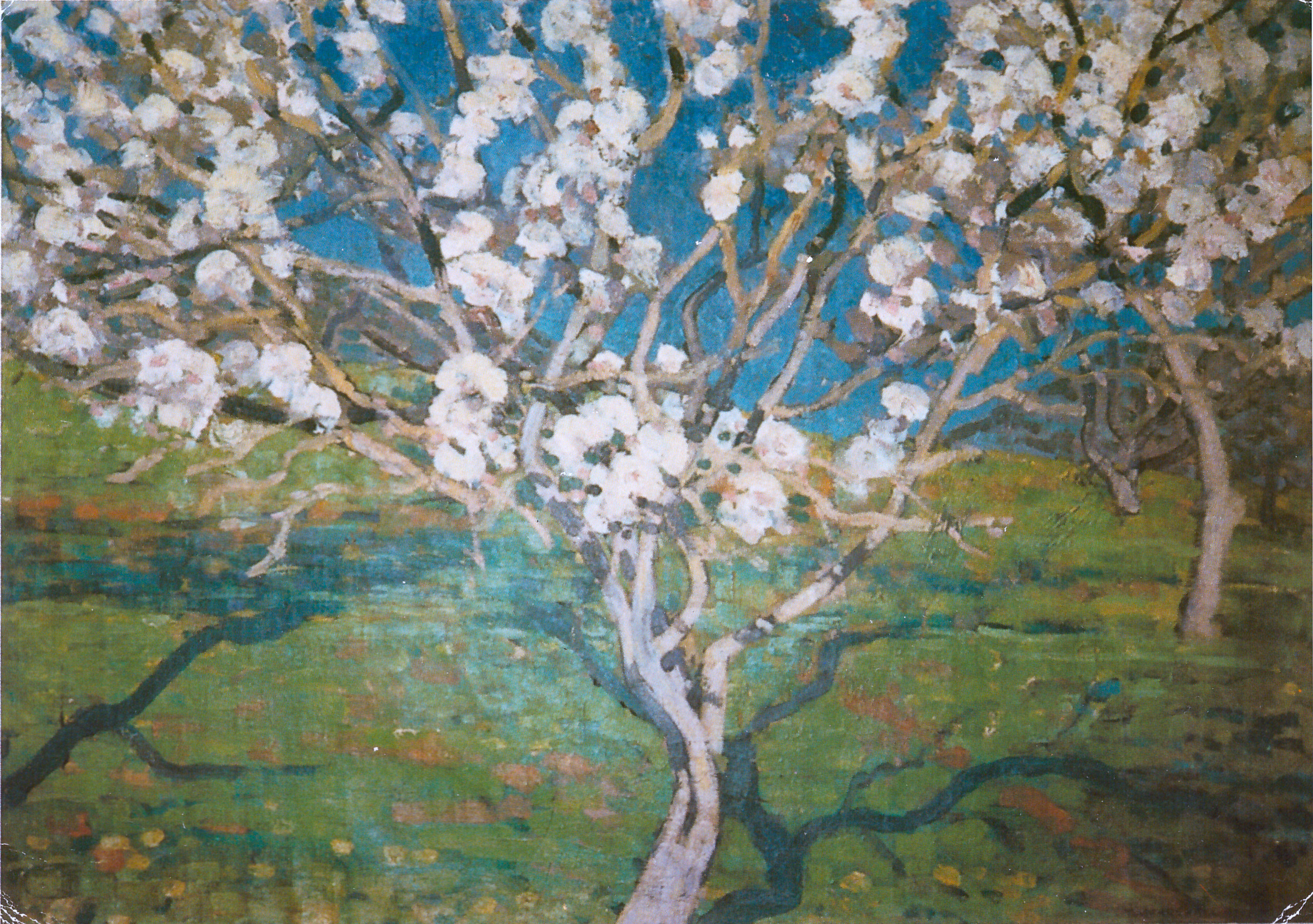
Amandiers en fleurs (Corse) (Blossom Almonds, 1910) - Museum of Oise, Beauvais.

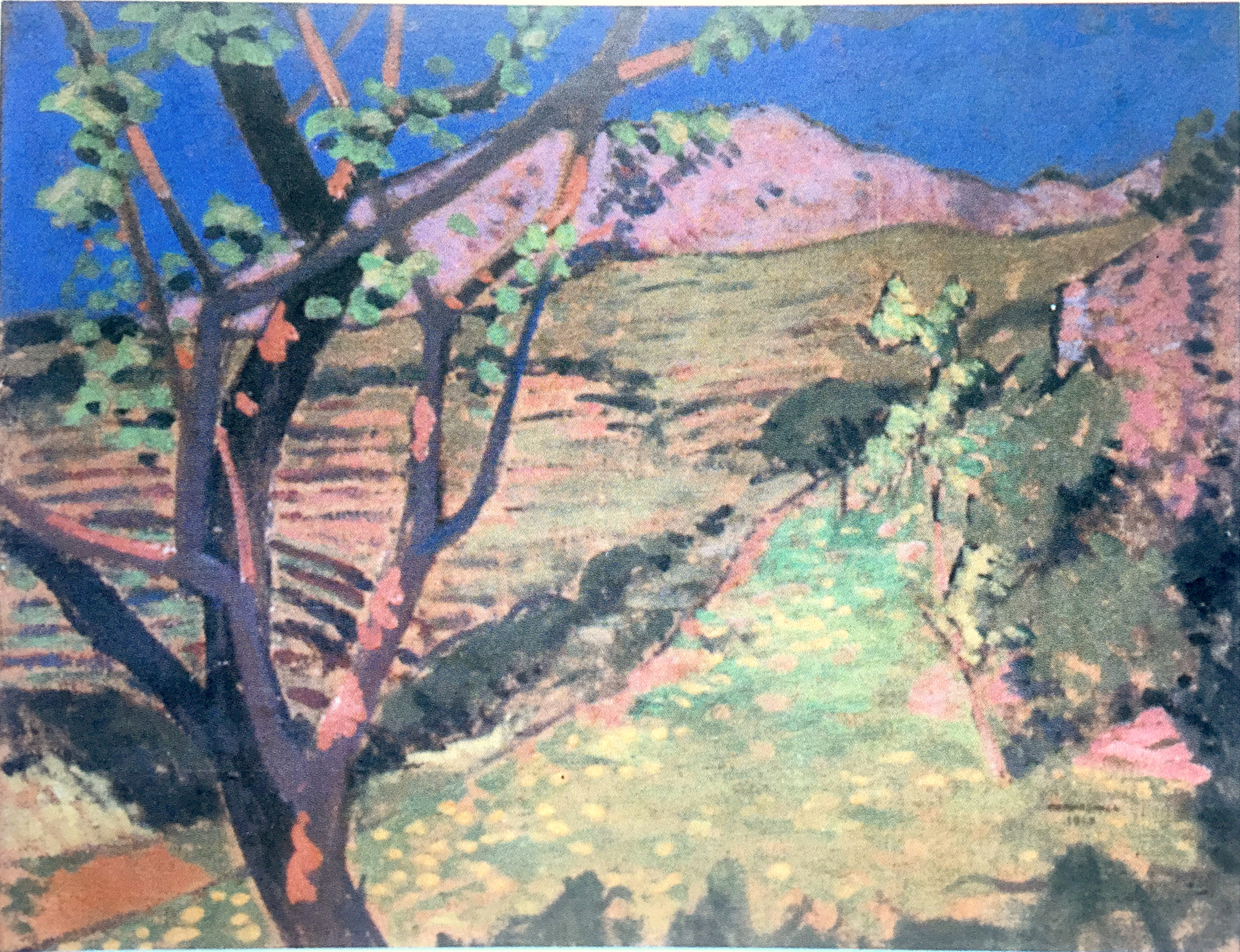
Montagne rose avec un arbre au premier plan (Pink Mountain with a Tree in the Foreground, 1912) - Museum of Corsican Ethnography, Bastia.

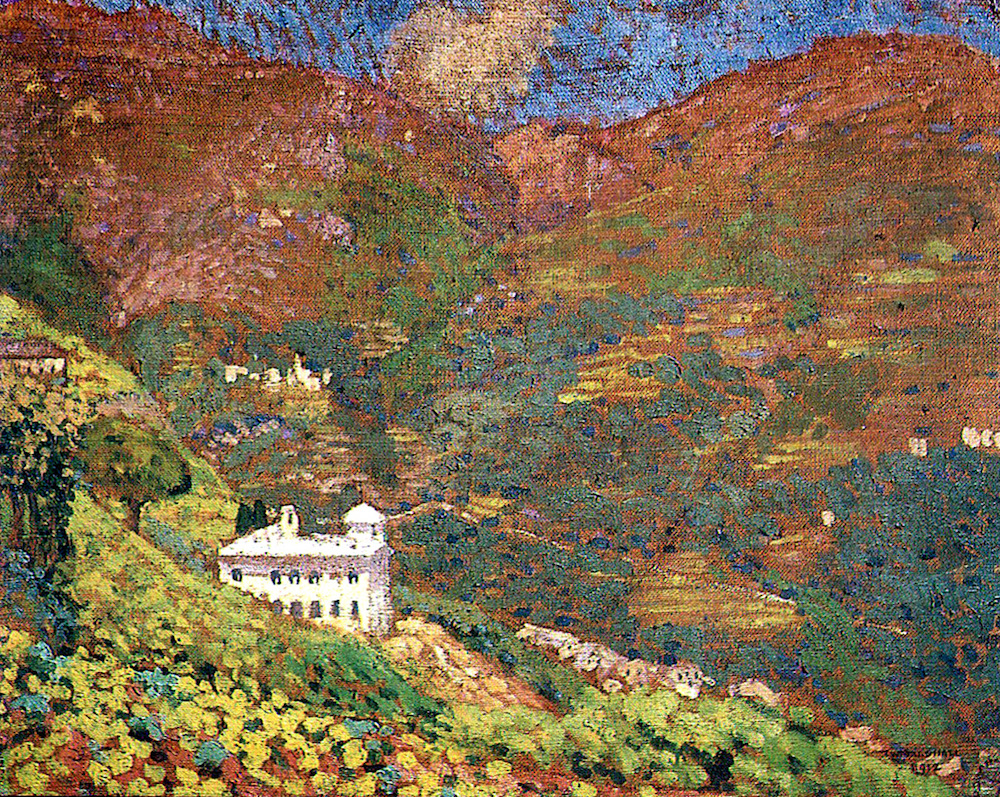
Vue du couvent de San Martino di Lota (View from San Martino di Lota Convent, 1912) - Museum of Corsican Ethnography, Bastia.

== Critics ==
Excerpts from critics published in the press for T.W.Marshall exhibitions:

- « His «Quai de la Seine, temps gris (The Seine Banks, cloudy weather) » and his « Coin de terrasse au Luxembourg (Terrace Corner at Luxemburg Garden) » are almost masterpieces, for their atmosphere gently deaf but still light and fluid. Marshall is ultra-modernist in the perfect sense of the word; he confines himself to smile at the retrograde mentality of those shocking brilliant initiatives and levelling common sense, — Narrow mindset that predominant events, misunderstood, irritates. How Marshall is right to give up to their tenderness these supporters of landscapes made in rooms and this said, easel paintings - or bedside paintings! ... » (press clippings Le Lynx, 1907).
- « William Marshall is also a truthful and a sad person who does not indulge himself the shortcoming of disguising anything: le Pont des Arts, le Pont Royal in winter, as we like it, appear to him clouded with smokes and mists rising from the river; the crowd with its familiar passers-by give them life from its perpetual back and forth. Marshall knows how to surprise the subtle soul of the cities and countrysides with their least favorable aspects in appearance. » (Leduc, Energie Française, April 21, 1907).
- « Mr. T. Marshall understands post-impressionism from the more dignified and less fumiste point of view. The severe architectural lines of his finely-harmonized "Villefranche-sur-Mer" tell well giving a sense of permanence; "The Last of the Apple Blossom, Poigny" bold to the point of extravagance, suggests an explosion of vernal beauty, of youth and vigour. » (The Daily Telegraph, July 10th 1911).
- « The work exhibited by M. Marshall affects a very special sobriety. Bords du canal Saint-Vinnemer (The banks of Saint-Vinnemer Canal), Villefranche, Verger (Orchard), are being looked at because of the simplicity in their production which do not impair in the least their effect. » (Boisard, Le Monde illustré, June 12th 1907).
- « TWM has a series of excellent landscapes, flawlessly elaborated, very broad, especially the seascapes, with their very synthetic production, though very expressive: in Bastia et le Couvent de Saint Antoine à travers les fourrés (Bastia and the Convent of Saint Antoine Through the Thickets), the horizon is as far as the eye can see, and a terribly hot atmosphere can be felt » (La Vie Mondaine, 1913).
- « Elegant spirit, from which we sense the culture and the great sensitivity, T.W. Marshall transcends effortlessly, in a beautiful pictorial language, his nudes voluptuously discreet, his simple and noble figures, his interiors felted with shadows, his quivering landscapes. » (Marc Avoy, Salon d'automne, 1987).
- « The lesson and the contribution of Thomas William Marshall, is that Nature is beautiful as it offers opportunities to be painted, that Life is good as it is source of beauty [...], that man is all greatness, freedom and hope [...] because art allows him with each morning, with each new painting, with each new look, to recreate the world's magnificence ! » (Jacques Foucart, Musée du Louvre (The Louvre Museum), May 1993).
