= Thomas William Marshall (controversialist) =

Thomas William Marshall (1818–1877) was a Roman Catholic convert from Anglicanism during the Tractarian controversies. In 1847 he became the first inspector of Catholic Schools in Great Britain. He resigned in 1860 after a controversy due to a pamphlet he wrote critical of Anglican missionary work.

== Life ==
The son of John Marshall, who in the premiership of Sir Robert Peel was government agent for colonising New South Wales, he was educated at Trinity College, Cambridge, where he graduated B.A. in 1840. Taking orders in the Church of England, he was appointed curate of Swallowcliffe and Anstey in Wiltshire. In 1845 he joined the Roman Catholic Church, and resigned his curacy. He subsequently became an inspector of schools.

About 1873 Marshall made a lecture tour in the United States. He received the degree of LL.D. from Georgetown University. Marshall died at Surbiton, Surrey, on 14 December 1877, and was buried at Mortlake.

== Works ==
In 1844, before his conversion, Marshall published Notes on the Episcopal Polity of the Holy Catholic Church: with some Account of the Development of the Modern Religious Systems.

He published Tabulated Reports on Roman Catholic Schools, inspected in the South and East of England and in South Wales, 1859. A later work by him, Christian Missions; their Agents, their Method, and their Results, 3 vols. London, 1862, went through several editions in the UK and the United States; it was translated into French and other European languages, and Pope Pius IX awarded the author the cross of the Order of St. Gregory. His other works include:

- Church Defence;
- Christianity in China: a fragment, London, 1858;
- Catholic Missions in Southern India, London, 1865, with William Strickland;
- My Clerical Friends and their Relation to Modern Thought, London, 1873;
- Protestant Journalism (anon.), London, 1874.
- The Russian Church
- Fictitious Appeals to a General Council
- Sketches of the Reformation
- Two Churches
- Modern Science

He contributed to The Tablet series of articles on "Religious Contrasts", 1875–6, on "The Protestant Tradition", June–December 1876, and on "Ritualism", 1877 (incomplete).

== Family ==
Marshall married Harriet Dansey, daughter of William Dansey, Rector of Donhead St Andrew in Wiltshire. She became a Catholic convert with him.

== See also ==
- Arthur Featherstone Marshall, his younger brother.
